

295001–295100 

|-bgcolor=#fefefe
| 295001 ||  || — || March 4, 2008 || Catalina || CSS || — || align=right | 1.1 km || 
|-id=002 bgcolor=#E9E9E9
| 295002 ||  || — || March 4, 2008 || Catalina || CSS || — || align=right | 2.8 km || 
|-id=003 bgcolor=#E9E9E9
| 295003 ||  || — || March 4, 2008 || Kitt Peak || Spacewatch || JUN || align=right | 1.8 km || 
|-id=004 bgcolor=#d6d6d6
| 295004 ||  || — || March 4, 2008 || Kitt Peak || Spacewatch || — || align=right | 3.2 km || 
|-id=005 bgcolor=#d6d6d6
| 295005 ||  || — || March 4, 2008 || Mount Lemmon || Mount Lemmon Survey || — || align=right | 4.0 km || 
|-id=006 bgcolor=#E9E9E9
| 295006 ||  || — || March 4, 2008 || Mount Lemmon || Mount Lemmon Survey || EUN || align=right | 1.4 km || 
|-id=007 bgcolor=#E9E9E9
| 295007 ||  || — || March 4, 2008 || Mount Lemmon || Mount Lemmon Survey || HOF || align=right | 2.8 km || 
|-id=008 bgcolor=#E9E9E9
| 295008 ||  || — || March 5, 2008 || Mount Lemmon || Mount Lemmon Survey || AGN || align=right | 1.4 km || 
|-id=009 bgcolor=#fefefe
| 295009 ||  || — || March 6, 2008 || Kitt Peak || Spacewatch || — || align=right data-sort-value="0.69" | 690 m || 
|-id=010 bgcolor=#fefefe
| 295010 ||  || — || March 6, 2008 || Kitt Peak || Spacewatch || NYS || align=right data-sort-value="0.74" | 740 m || 
|-id=011 bgcolor=#d6d6d6
| 295011 ||  || — || March 6, 2008 || Kitt Peak || Spacewatch || HYG || align=right | 3.2 km || 
|-id=012 bgcolor=#fefefe
| 295012 ||  || — || March 6, 2008 || Kitt Peak || Spacewatch || — || align=right data-sort-value="0.72" | 720 m || 
|-id=013 bgcolor=#fefefe
| 295013 ||  || — || March 6, 2008 || Mount Lemmon || Mount Lemmon Survey || — || align=right data-sort-value="0.88" | 880 m || 
|-id=014 bgcolor=#E9E9E9
| 295014 ||  || — || March 6, 2008 || Kitt Peak || Spacewatch || — || align=right | 2.5 km || 
|-id=015 bgcolor=#fefefe
| 295015 ||  || — || March 6, 2008 || Kitt Peak || Spacewatch || — || align=right | 1.1 km || 
|-id=016 bgcolor=#E9E9E9
| 295016 ||  || — || March 6, 2008 || Kitt Peak || Spacewatch || — || align=right | 1.8 km || 
|-id=017 bgcolor=#d6d6d6
| 295017 ||  || — || March 7, 2008 || Mount Lemmon || Mount Lemmon Survey || 615 || align=right | 1.6 km || 
|-id=018 bgcolor=#d6d6d6
| 295018 ||  || — || March 7, 2008 || Mount Lemmon || Mount Lemmon Survey || — || align=right | 2.7 km || 
|-id=019 bgcolor=#E9E9E9
| 295019 ||  || — || March 8, 2008 || Kitt Peak || Spacewatch || — || align=right | 1.6 km || 
|-id=020 bgcolor=#fefefe
| 295020 ||  || — || March 8, 2008 || Catalina || CSS || FLO || align=right data-sort-value="0.87" | 870 m || 
|-id=021 bgcolor=#C2FFFF
| 295021 ||  || — || March 10, 2008 || Mount Lemmon || Mount Lemmon Survey || L5 || align=right | 14 km || 
|-id=022 bgcolor=#fefefe
| 295022 ||  || — || March 5, 2008 || Mount Lemmon || Mount Lemmon Survey || FLO || align=right data-sort-value="0.87" | 870 m || 
|-id=023 bgcolor=#d6d6d6
| 295023 ||  || — || March 7, 2008 || Kitt Peak || Spacewatch || — || align=right | 3.5 km || 
|-id=024 bgcolor=#C2FFFF
| 295024 ||  || — || March 7, 2008 || Kitt Peak || Spacewatch || L5 || align=right | 11 km || 
|-id=025 bgcolor=#fefefe
| 295025 ||  || — || March 7, 2008 || Kitt Peak || Spacewatch || — || align=right | 1.3 km || 
|-id=026 bgcolor=#d6d6d6
| 295026 ||  || — || March 7, 2008 || Kitt Peak || Spacewatch || KAR || align=right | 1.6 km || 
|-id=027 bgcolor=#E9E9E9
| 295027 ||  || — || March 7, 2008 || Kitt Peak || Spacewatch || MRX || align=right | 1.1 km || 
|-id=028 bgcolor=#d6d6d6
| 295028 ||  || — || March 7, 2008 || Kitt Peak || Spacewatch || — || align=right | 3.3 km || 
|-id=029 bgcolor=#d6d6d6
| 295029 ||  || — || March 7, 2008 || Kitt Peak || Spacewatch || THM || align=right | 2.8 km || 
|-id=030 bgcolor=#E9E9E9
| 295030 ||  || — || March 8, 2008 || Mount Lemmon || Mount Lemmon Survey || — || align=right | 1.8 km || 
|-id=031 bgcolor=#E9E9E9
| 295031 ||  || — || March 10, 2008 || Kitt Peak || Spacewatch || — || align=right | 1.5 km || 
|-id=032 bgcolor=#d6d6d6
| 295032 ||  || — || March 10, 2008 || Catalina || CSS || — || align=right | 4.1 km || 
|-id=033 bgcolor=#d6d6d6
| 295033 ||  || — || March 2, 2008 || Socorro || LINEAR || 7:4 || align=right | 6.6 km || 
|-id=034 bgcolor=#fefefe
| 295034 ||  || — || March 8, 2008 || Socorro || LINEAR || FLO || align=right data-sort-value="0.77" | 770 m || 
|-id=035 bgcolor=#E9E9E9
| 295035 ||  || — || March 12, 2008 || Wrightwood || J. W. Young || — || align=right data-sort-value="0.86" | 860 m || 
|-id=036 bgcolor=#E9E9E9
| 295036 ||  || — || March 7, 2008 || Kitt Peak || Spacewatch || AGN || align=right | 1.6 km || 
|-id=037 bgcolor=#fefefe
| 295037 ||  || — || March 10, 2008 || Socorro || LINEAR || — || align=right | 1.2 km || 
|-id=038 bgcolor=#fefefe
| 295038 ||  || — || March 3, 2008 || Catalina || CSS || NYS || align=right data-sort-value="0.81" | 810 m || 
|-id=039 bgcolor=#E9E9E9
| 295039 ||  || — || March 1, 2008 || Mount Lemmon || Mount Lemmon Survey || — || align=right | 1.6 km || 
|-id=040 bgcolor=#fefefe
| 295040 ||  || — || March 6, 2008 || Mount Lemmon || Mount Lemmon Survey || — || align=right | 1.1 km || 
|-id=041 bgcolor=#fefefe
| 295041 ||  || — || March 3, 2008 || Catalina || CSS || — || align=right | 1.2 km || 
|-id=042 bgcolor=#fefefe
| 295042 ||  || — || March 3, 2008 || Catalina || CSS || — || align=right | 1.2 km || 
|-id=043 bgcolor=#E9E9E9
| 295043 ||  || — || March 4, 2008 || Catalina || CSS || — || align=right | 1.4 km || 
|-id=044 bgcolor=#d6d6d6
| 295044 ||  || — || March 6, 2008 || Catalina || CSS || URS || align=right | 5.6 km || 
|-id=045 bgcolor=#fefefe
| 295045 ||  || — || March 6, 2008 || Catalina || CSS || — || align=right | 1.2 km || 
|-id=046 bgcolor=#fefefe
| 295046 ||  || — || March 5, 2008 || Mount Lemmon || Mount Lemmon Survey || — || align=right data-sort-value="0.79" | 790 m || 
|-id=047 bgcolor=#fefefe
| 295047 ||  || — || March 6, 2008 || Mount Lemmon || Mount Lemmon Survey || — || align=right data-sort-value="0.71" | 710 m || 
|-id=048 bgcolor=#fefefe
| 295048 ||  || — || March 7, 2008 || Mount Lemmon || Mount Lemmon Survey || MAS || align=right data-sort-value="0.80" | 800 m || 
|-id=049 bgcolor=#fefefe
| 295049 ||  || — || March 7, 2008 || Mount Lemmon || Mount Lemmon Survey || FLO || align=right data-sort-value="0.65" | 650 m || 
|-id=050 bgcolor=#fefefe
| 295050 ||  || — || March 7, 2008 || Mount Lemmon || Mount Lemmon Survey || — || align=right data-sort-value="0.62" | 620 m || 
|-id=051 bgcolor=#E9E9E9
| 295051 ||  || — || March 8, 2008 || Kitt Peak || Spacewatch || — || align=right | 3.0 km || 
|-id=052 bgcolor=#d6d6d6
| 295052 ||  || — || March 8, 2008 || Kitt Peak || Spacewatch || — || align=right | 3.3 km || 
|-id=053 bgcolor=#d6d6d6
| 295053 ||  || — || March 8, 2008 || Kitt Peak || Spacewatch || — || align=right | 3.6 km || 
|-id=054 bgcolor=#d6d6d6
| 295054 ||  || — || March 8, 2008 || Kitt Peak || Spacewatch || — || align=right | 3.9 km || 
|-id=055 bgcolor=#E9E9E9
| 295055 ||  || — || March 8, 2008 || Kitt Peak || Spacewatch || WIT || align=right | 1.3 km || 
|-id=056 bgcolor=#E9E9E9
| 295056 ||  || — || March 8, 2008 || Mount Lemmon || Mount Lemmon Survey || — || align=right | 2.8 km || 
|-id=057 bgcolor=#fefefe
| 295057 ||  || — || March 8, 2008 || Kitt Peak || Spacewatch || — || align=right | 1.1 km || 
|-id=058 bgcolor=#E9E9E9
| 295058 ||  || — || March 8, 2008 || Kitt Peak || Spacewatch || — || align=right | 1.5 km || 
|-id=059 bgcolor=#d6d6d6
| 295059 ||  || — || March 9, 2008 || Mount Lemmon || Mount Lemmon Survey || KOR || align=right | 1.2 km || 
|-id=060 bgcolor=#d6d6d6
| 295060 ||  || — || March 9, 2008 || Kitt Peak || Spacewatch || THB || align=right | 4.0 km || 
|-id=061 bgcolor=#fefefe
| 295061 ||  || — || March 9, 2008 || Kitt Peak || Spacewatch || — || align=right data-sort-value="0.93" | 930 m || 
|-id=062 bgcolor=#E9E9E9
| 295062 ||  || — || March 9, 2008 || Kitt Peak || Spacewatch || HEN || align=right | 1.0 km || 
|-id=063 bgcolor=#fefefe
| 295063 ||  || — || March 9, 2008 || Kitt Peak || Spacewatch || NYS || align=right data-sort-value="0.63" | 630 m || 
|-id=064 bgcolor=#fefefe
| 295064 ||  || — || March 9, 2008 || Kitt Peak || Spacewatch || NYS || align=right | 1.3 km || 
|-id=065 bgcolor=#E9E9E9
| 295065 ||  || — || March 9, 2008 || Kitt Peak || Spacewatch || MRX || align=right data-sort-value="0.98" | 980 m || 
|-id=066 bgcolor=#d6d6d6
| 295066 ||  || — || March 9, 2008 || Kitt Peak || Spacewatch || — || align=right | 3.9 km || 
|-id=067 bgcolor=#E9E9E9
| 295067 ||  || — || March 9, 2008 || Kitt Peak || Spacewatch || — || align=right | 1.5 km || 
|-id=068 bgcolor=#fefefe
| 295068 ||  || — || March 9, 2008 || Kitt Peak || Spacewatch || — || align=right data-sort-value="0.94" | 940 m || 
|-id=069 bgcolor=#fefefe
| 295069 ||  || — || March 10, 2008 || Catalina || CSS || — || align=right data-sort-value="0.91" | 910 m || 
|-id=070 bgcolor=#fefefe
| 295070 ||  || — || March 10, 2008 || Catalina || CSS || — || align=right | 1.5 km || 
|-id=071 bgcolor=#d6d6d6
| 295071 ||  || — || March 10, 2008 || Kitt Peak || Spacewatch || KOR || align=right | 1.4 km || 
|-id=072 bgcolor=#d6d6d6
| 295072 ||  || — || March 10, 2008 || Mount Lemmon || Mount Lemmon Survey || — || align=right | 2.7 km || 
|-id=073 bgcolor=#fefefe
| 295073 ||  || — || March 11, 2008 || Kitt Peak || Spacewatch || — || align=right | 1.1 km || 
|-id=074 bgcolor=#fefefe
| 295074 ||  || — || March 11, 2008 || Kitt Peak || Spacewatch || NYS || align=right data-sort-value="0.92" | 920 m || 
|-id=075 bgcolor=#E9E9E9
| 295075 ||  || — || March 11, 2008 || Kitt Peak || Spacewatch || — || align=right | 1.6 km || 
|-id=076 bgcolor=#E9E9E9
| 295076 ||  || — || March 11, 2008 || Kitt Peak || Spacewatch || DOR || align=right | 3.5 km || 
|-id=077 bgcolor=#d6d6d6
| 295077 ||  || — || March 11, 2008 || Mount Lemmon || Mount Lemmon Survey || EOS || align=right | 2.9 km || 
|-id=078 bgcolor=#fefefe
| 295078 ||  || — || March 11, 2008 || Mount Lemmon || Mount Lemmon Survey || — || align=right data-sort-value="0.91" | 910 m || 
|-id=079 bgcolor=#d6d6d6
| 295079 ||  || — || March 11, 2008 || Kitt Peak || Spacewatch || KOR || align=right | 1.5 km || 
|-id=080 bgcolor=#d6d6d6
| 295080 ||  || — || March 11, 2008 || Kitt Peak || Spacewatch || — || align=right | 2.3 km || 
|-id=081 bgcolor=#E9E9E9
| 295081 ||  || — || March 11, 2008 || Kitt Peak || Spacewatch || — || align=right data-sort-value="0.95" | 950 m || 
|-id=082 bgcolor=#fefefe
| 295082 ||  || — || March 11, 2008 || Kitt Peak || Spacewatch || NYS || align=right data-sort-value="0.68" | 680 m || 
|-id=083 bgcolor=#E9E9E9
| 295083 ||  || — || March 11, 2008 || Kitt Peak || Spacewatch || — || align=right data-sort-value="0.78" | 780 m || 
|-id=084 bgcolor=#E9E9E9
| 295084 ||  || — || March 11, 2008 || Kitt Peak || Spacewatch || — || align=right | 1.6 km || 
|-id=085 bgcolor=#E9E9E9
| 295085 ||  || — || March 12, 2008 || Kitt Peak || Spacewatch || — || align=right | 2.7 km || 
|-id=086 bgcolor=#fefefe
| 295086 ||  || — || March 12, 2008 || Kitt Peak || Spacewatch || V || align=right data-sort-value="0.84" | 840 m || 
|-id=087 bgcolor=#d6d6d6
| 295087 ||  || — || March 11, 2008 || Kitt Peak || Spacewatch || — || align=right | 3.1 km || 
|-id=088 bgcolor=#E9E9E9
| 295088 ||  || — || March 1, 2008 || Kitt Peak || Spacewatch || — || align=right | 2.6 km || 
|-id=089 bgcolor=#d6d6d6
| 295089 ||  || — || March 1, 2008 || Kitt Peak || Spacewatch || EUP || align=right | 3.9 km || 
|-id=090 bgcolor=#E9E9E9
| 295090 ||  || — || March 4, 2008 || Kitt Peak || Spacewatch || HOF || align=right | 3.4 km || 
|-id=091 bgcolor=#d6d6d6
| 295091 ||  || — || March 6, 2008 || Kitt Peak || Spacewatch || — || align=right | 2.2 km || 
|-id=092 bgcolor=#d6d6d6
| 295092 ||  || — || March 9, 2008 || Kitt Peak || Spacewatch || — || align=right | 3.1 km || 
|-id=093 bgcolor=#fefefe
| 295093 ||  || — || March 8, 2008 || Mount Lemmon || Mount Lemmon Survey || — || align=right data-sort-value="0.87" | 870 m || 
|-id=094 bgcolor=#fefefe
| 295094 ||  || — || March 2, 2008 || Kitt Peak || Spacewatch || NYS || align=right data-sort-value="0.60" | 600 m || 
|-id=095 bgcolor=#E9E9E9
| 295095 ||  || — || March 10, 2008 || Mount Lemmon || Mount Lemmon Survey || — || align=right | 3.9 km || 
|-id=096 bgcolor=#d6d6d6
| 295096 ||  || — || March 10, 2008 || Mount Lemmon || Mount Lemmon Survey || CHA || align=right | 2.5 km || 
|-id=097 bgcolor=#d6d6d6
| 295097 ||  || — || March 3, 2008 || Purple Mountain || PMO NEO || EOS || align=right | 4.0 km || 
|-id=098 bgcolor=#E9E9E9
| 295098 ||  || — || March 10, 2008 || Kitt Peak || Spacewatch || — || align=right | 2.1 km || 
|-id=099 bgcolor=#d6d6d6
| 295099 ||  || — || March 1, 2008 || Kitt Peak || Spacewatch || 3:2 || align=right | 4.4 km || 
|-id=100 bgcolor=#E9E9E9
| 295100 ||  || — || March 8, 2008 || Kitt Peak || Spacewatch || — || align=right | 2.3 km || 
|}

295101–295200 

|-bgcolor=#d6d6d6
| 295101 ||  || — || March 8, 2008 || Mount Lemmon || Mount Lemmon Survey || — || align=right | 2.4 km || 
|-id=102 bgcolor=#d6d6d6
| 295102 ||  || — || March 11, 2008 || Kitt Peak || Spacewatch || — || align=right | 4.9 km || 
|-id=103 bgcolor=#E9E9E9
| 295103 ||  || — || March 13, 2008 || Kitt Peak || Spacewatch || AST || align=right | 1.7 km || 
|-id=104 bgcolor=#d6d6d6
| 295104 ||  || — || March 2, 2008 || Kitt Peak || Spacewatch || — || align=right | 2.6 km || 
|-id=105 bgcolor=#E9E9E9
| 295105 ||  || — || March 4, 2008 || Catalina || CSS || PAD || align=right | 3.2 km || 
|-id=106 bgcolor=#E9E9E9
| 295106 ||  || — || March 4, 2008 || Catalina || CSS || — || align=right | 3.3 km || 
|-id=107 bgcolor=#E9E9E9
| 295107 ||  || — || March 6, 2008 || Mount Lemmon || Mount Lemmon Survey || — || align=right | 2.0 km || 
|-id=108 bgcolor=#fefefe
| 295108 ||  || — || March 8, 2008 || Mount Lemmon || Mount Lemmon Survey || MAS || align=right data-sort-value="0.82" | 820 m || 
|-id=109 bgcolor=#d6d6d6
| 295109 ||  || — || March 25, 2008 || Kitt Peak || Spacewatch || VER || align=right | 3.9 km || 
|-id=110 bgcolor=#d6d6d6
| 295110 ||  || — || March 25, 2008 || Kitt Peak || Spacewatch || — || align=right | 3.0 km || 
|-id=111 bgcolor=#d6d6d6
| 295111 ||  || — || March 26, 2008 || Mount Lemmon || Mount Lemmon Survey || — || align=right | 3.0 km || 
|-id=112 bgcolor=#E9E9E9
| 295112 ||  || — || March 26, 2008 || Mount Lemmon || Mount Lemmon Survey || HEN || align=right data-sort-value="0.97" | 970 m || 
|-id=113 bgcolor=#fefefe
| 295113 ||  || — || March 26, 2008 || Mayhill || W. G. Dillon || MAS || align=right data-sort-value="0.94" | 940 m || 
|-id=114 bgcolor=#d6d6d6
| 295114 ||  || — || March 28, 2008 || Jarnac || Jarnac Obs. || — || align=right | 6.7 km || 
|-id=115 bgcolor=#d6d6d6
| 295115 ||  || — || March 25, 2008 || Kitt Peak || Spacewatch || THB || align=right | 4.0 km || 
|-id=116 bgcolor=#fefefe
| 295116 ||  || — || March 26, 2008 || Kitt Peak || Spacewatch || — || align=right data-sort-value="0.60" | 600 m || 
|-id=117 bgcolor=#d6d6d6
| 295117 ||  || — || March 26, 2008 || Kitt Peak || Spacewatch || — || align=right | 3.0 km || 
|-id=118 bgcolor=#d6d6d6
| 295118 ||  || — || March 26, 2008 || Mount Lemmon || Mount Lemmon Survey || EOS || align=right | 3.8 km || 
|-id=119 bgcolor=#fefefe
| 295119 ||  || — || March 26, 2008 || Kitt Peak || Spacewatch || — || align=right | 1.1 km || 
|-id=120 bgcolor=#E9E9E9
| 295120 ||  || — || March 26, 2008 || Kitt Peak || Spacewatch || — || align=right | 3.2 km || 
|-id=121 bgcolor=#E9E9E9
| 295121 ||  || — || March 27, 2008 || Kitt Peak || Spacewatch || AGN || align=right | 1.5 km || 
|-id=122 bgcolor=#fefefe
| 295122 ||  || — || March 27, 2008 || Kitt Peak || Spacewatch || — || align=right | 1.1 km || 
|-id=123 bgcolor=#E9E9E9
| 295123 ||  || — || March 27, 2008 || Kitt Peak || Spacewatch || WIT || align=right | 1.2 km || 
|-id=124 bgcolor=#E9E9E9
| 295124 ||  || — || March 27, 2008 || Kitt Peak || Spacewatch || NEM || align=right | 3.2 km || 
|-id=125 bgcolor=#d6d6d6
| 295125 ||  || — || March 27, 2008 || Kitt Peak || Spacewatch || EOS || align=right | 2.1 km || 
|-id=126 bgcolor=#d6d6d6
| 295126 ||  || — || March 27, 2008 || Mount Lemmon || Mount Lemmon Survey || HYG || align=right | 4.3 km || 
|-id=127 bgcolor=#fefefe
| 295127 ||  || — || March 27, 2008 || Kitt Peak || Spacewatch || FLO || align=right data-sort-value="0.77" | 770 m || 
|-id=128 bgcolor=#fefefe
| 295128 ||  || — || March 27, 2008 || Kitt Peak || Spacewatch || NYS || align=right data-sort-value="0.71" | 710 m || 
|-id=129 bgcolor=#E9E9E9
| 295129 ||  || — || March 27, 2008 || Kitt Peak || Spacewatch || — || align=right | 1.7 km || 
|-id=130 bgcolor=#fefefe
| 295130 ||  || — || March 27, 2008 || Lulin Observatory || LUSS || FLO || align=right data-sort-value="0.62" | 620 m || 
|-id=131 bgcolor=#E9E9E9
| 295131 ||  || — || March 27, 2008 || Lulin || LUSS || DOR || align=right | 3.3 km || 
|-id=132 bgcolor=#E9E9E9
| 295132 ||  || — || March 28, 2008 || Kitt Peak || Spacewatch || — || align=right data-sort-value="0.98" | 980 m || 
|-id=133 bgcolor=#E9E9E9
| 295133 ||  || — || March 28, 2008 || Kitt Peak || Spacewatch || — || align=right | 1.8 km || 
|-id=134 bgcolor=#d6d6d6
| 295134 ||  || — || March 28, 2008 || Kitt Peak || Spacewatch || — || align=right | 2.7 km || 
|-id=135 bgcolor=#fefefe
| 295135 ||  || — || March 28, 2008 || Kitt Peak || Spacewatch || NYS || align=right data-sort-value="0.81" | 810 m || 
|-id=136 bgcolor=#d6d6d6
| 295136 ||  || — || March 28, 2008 || Mount Lemmon || Mount Lemmon Survey || HYG || align=right | 2.8 km || 
|-id=137 bgcolor=#fefefe
| 295137 ||  || — || March 28, 2008 || Mount Lemmon || Mount Lemmon Survey || FLO || align=right data-sort-value="0.67" | 670 m || 
|-id=138 bgcolor=#fefefe
| 295138 ||  || — || March 28, 2008 || Mount Lemmon || Mount Lemmon Survey || — || align=right data-sort-value="0.72" | 720 m || 
|-id=139 bgcolor=#d6d6d6
| 295139 ||  || — || March 28, 2008 || Kitt Peak || Spacewatch || — || align=right | 2.4 km || 
|-id=140 bgcolor=#C2FFFF
| 295140 ||  || — || March 28, 2008 || Kitt Peak || Spacewatch || L5 || align=right | 9.2 km || 
|-id=141 bgcolor=#E9E9E9
| 295141 ||  || — || March 28, 2008 || Kitt Peak || Spacewatch || HEN || align=right | 1.3 km || 
|-id=142 bgcolor=#fefefe
| 295142 ||  || — || March 28, 2008 || Kitt Peak || Spacewatch || — || align=right data-sort-value="0.91" | 910 m || 
|-id=143 bgcolor=#fefefe
| 295143 ||  || — || March 28, 2008 || Kitt Peak || Spacewatch || V || align=right data-sort-value="0.89" | 890 m || 
|-id=144 bgcolor=#fefefe
| 295144 ||  || — || March 28, 2008 || Kitt Peak || Spacewatch || — || align=right data-sort-value="0.77" | 770 m || 
|-id=145 bgcolor=#d6d6d6
| 295145 ||  || — || March 28, 2008 || Kitt Peak || Spacewatch || — || align=right | 3.2 km || 
|-id=146 bgcolor=#E9E9E9
| 295146 ||  || — || March 28, 2008 || Mount Lemmon || Mount Lemmon Survey || — || align=right | 1.5 km || 
|-id=147 bgcolor=#fefefe
| 295147 ||  || — || March 28, 2008 || Mount Lemmon || Mount Lemmon Survey || NYS || align=right data-sort-value="0.72" | 720 m || 
|-id=148 bgcolor=#E9E9E9
| 295148 ||  || — || March 28, 2008 || Mount Lemmon || Mount Lemmon Survey || — || align=right | 1.5 km || 
|-id=149 bgcolor=#E9E9E9
| 295149 ||  || — || March 28, 2008 || Mount Lemmon || Mount Lemmon Survey || — || align=right | 2.1 km || 
|-id=150 bgcolor=#d6d6d6
| 295150 ||  || — || March 28, 2008 || Mount Lemmon || Mount Lemmon Survey || KOR || align=right | 1.5 km || 
|-id=151 bgcolor=#d6d6d6
| 295151 ||  || — || March 28, 2008 || Mount Lemmon || Mount Lemmon Survey || — || align=right | 3.6 km || 
|-id=152 bgcolor=#d6d6d6
| 295152 ||  || — || March 28, 2008 || Mount Lemmon || Mount Lemmon Survey || EOS || align=right | 2.8 km || 
|-id=153 bgcolor=#C2FFFF
| 295153 ||  || — || March 28, 2008 || Mount Lemmon || Mount Lemmon Survey || L5 || align=right | 13 km || 
|-id=154 bgcolor=#fefefe
| 295154 ||  || — || March 29, 2008 || Mount Lemmon || Mount Lemmon Survey || FLO || align=right data-sort-value="0.67" | 670 m || 
|-id=155 bgcolor=#fefefe
| 295155 ||  || — || March 29, 2008 || Catalina || CSS || V || align=right data-sort-value="0.93" | 930 m || 
|-id=156 bgcolor=#d6d6d6
| 295156 ||  || — || March 25, 2008 || Kitt Peak || Spacewatch || — || align=right | 3.8 km || 
|-id=157 bgcolor=#fefefe
| 295157 ||  || — || March 27, 2008 || Kitt Peak || Spacewatch || NYS || align=right data-sort-value="0.84" | 840 m || 
|-id=158 bgcolor=#fefefe
| 295158 ||  || — || March 27, 2008 || Kitt Peak || Spacewatch || FLO || align=right data-sort-value="0.75" | 750 m || 
|-id=159 bgcolor=#d6d6d6
| 295159 ||  || — || March 27, 2008 || Kitt Peak || Spacewatch || MEL || align=right | 4.0 km || 
|-id=160 bgcolor=#fefefe
| 295160 ||  || — || March 28, 2008 || Kitt Peak || Spacewatch || NYS || align=right data-sort-value="0.74" | 740 m || 
|-id=161 bgcolor=#d6d6d6
| 295161 ||  || — || March 28, 2008 || Kitt Peak || Spacewatch || — || align=right | 2.4 km || 
|-id=162 bgcolor=#E9E9E9
| 295162 ||  || — || March 28, 2008 || Kitt Peak || Spacewatch || — || align=right data-sort-value="0.93" | 930 m || 
|-id=163 bgcolor=#E9E9E9
| 295163 ||  || — || March 28, 2008 || Mount Lemmon || Mount Lemmon Survey || KON || align=right | 3.1 km || 
|-id=164 bgcolor=#E9E9E9
| 295164 ||  || — || March 28, 2008 || Mount Lemmon || Mount Lemmon Survey || — || align=right | 1.1 km || 
|-id=165 bgcolor=#E9E9E9
| 295165 ||  || — || March 28, 2008 || Mount Lemmon || Mount Lemmon Survey || — || align=right | 3.0 km || 
|-id=166 bgcolor=#E9E9E9
| 295166 ||  || — || March 28, 2008 || Mount Lemmon || Mount Lemmon Survey || — || align=right | 1.1 km || 
|-id=167 bgcolor=#fefefe
| 295167 ||  || — || March 28, 2008 || Mount Lemmon || Mount Lemmon Survey || — || align=right data-sort-value="0.75" | 750 m || 
|-id=168 bgcolor=#E9E9E9
| 295168 ||  || — || March 29, 2008 || Catalina || CSS || — || align=right | 4.2 km || 
|-id=169 bgcolor=#d6d6d6
| 295169 ||  || — || March 30, 2008 || Kitt Peak || Spacewatch || VER || align=right | 3.5 km || 
|-id=170 bgcolor=#C2FFFF
| 295170 ||  || — || March 30, 2008 || Kitt Peak || Spacewatch || L5 || align=right | 10 km || 
|-id=171 bgcolor=#d6d6d6
| 295171 ||  || — || March 27, 2008 || Mount Lemmon || Mount Lemmon Survey || KAR || align=right | 1.0 km || 
|-id=172 bgcolor=#E9E9E9
| 295172 ||  || — || March 27, 2008 || Mount Lemmon || Mount Lemmon Survey || — || align=right | 1.0 km || 
|-id=173 bgcolor=#E9E9E9
| 295173 ||  || — || March 28, 2008 || Kitt Peak || Spacewatch || AGN || align=right | 1.4 km || 
|-id=174 bgcolor=#fefefe
| 295174 ||  || — || March 28, 2008 || Kitt Peak || Spacewatch || FLO || align=right data-sort-value="0.85" | 850 m || 
|-id=175 bgcolor=#E9E9E9
| 295175 ||  || — || March 28, 2008 || Mount Lemmon || Mount Lemmon Survey || — || align=right | 1.7 km || 
|-id=176 bgcolor=#E9E9E9
| 295176 ||  || — || March 28, 2008 || Mount Lemmon || Mount Lemmon Survey || — || align=right | 1.6 km || 
|-id=177 bgcolor=#d6d6d6
| 295177 ||  || — || March 29, 2008 || Mount Lemmon || Mount Lemmon Survey || — || align=right | 4.2 km || 
|-id=178 bgcolor=#fefefe
| 295178 ||  || — || March 29, 2008 || Mount Lemmon || Mount Lemmon Survey || — || align=right data-sort-value="0.78" | 780 m || 
|-id=179 bgcolor=#E9E9E9
| 295179 ||  || — || March 29, 2008 || Mount Lemmon || Mount Lemmon Survey || — || align=right | 2.8 km || 
|-id=180 bgcolor=#E9E9E9
| 295180 ||  || — || March 29, 2008 || Mount Lemmon || Mount Lemmon Survey || DOR || align=right | 3.7 km || 
|-id=181 bgcolor=#fefefe
| 295181 ||  || — || March 29, 2008 || Catalina || CSS || FLO || align=right data-sort-value="0.77" | 770 m || 
|-id=182 bgcolor=#d6d6d6
| 295182 ||  || — || March 29, 2008 || Kitt Peak || Spacewatch || — || align=right | 2.8 km || 
|-id=183 bgcolor=#d6d6d6
| 295183 ||  || — || March 29, 2008 || Kitt Peak || Spacewatch || HYG || align=right | 3.8 km || 
|-id=184 bgcolor=#d6d6d6
| 295184 ||  || — || March 29, 2008 || Kitt Peak || Spacewatch || — || align=right | 3.1 km || 
|-id=185 bgcolor=#E9E9E9
| 295185 ||  || — || March 29, 2008 || Mount Lemmon || Mount Lemmon Survey || — || align=right | 2.5 km || 
|-id=186 bgcolor=#fefefe
| 295186 ||  || — || March 29, 2008 || Catalina || CSS || PHO || align=right | 1.3 km || 
|-id=187 bgcolor=#E9E9E9
| 295187 ||  || — || March 30, 2008 || Kitt Peak || Spacewatch || — || align=right | 2.8 km || 
|-id=188 bgcolor=#E9E9E9
| 295188 ||  || — || March 30, 2008 || Kitt Peak || Spacewatch || — || align=right | 1.0 km || 
|-id=189 bgcolor=#fefefe
| 295189 ||  || — || March 30, 2008 || Kitt Peak || Spacewatch || V || align=right data-sort-value="0.69" | 690 m || 
|-id=190 bgcolor=#d6d6d6
| 295190 ||  || — || March 30, 2008 || Kitt Peak || Spacewatch || — || align=right | 3.2 km || 
|-id=191 bgcolor=#d6d6d6
| 295191 ||  || — || March 30, 2008 || Kitt Peak || Spacewatch || CHA || align=right | 2.6 km || 
|-id=192 bgcolor=#d6d6d6
| 295192 ||  || — || March 30, 2008 || Kitt Peak || Spacewatch || HYG || align=right | 3.5 km || 
|-id=193 bgcolor=#E9E9E9
| 295193 ||  || — || March 30, 2008 || Kitt Peak || Spacewatch || — || align=right | 2.4 km || 
|-id=194 bgcolor=#d6d6d6
| 295194 ||  || — || March 30, 2008 || Kitt Peak || Spacewatch || CHA || align=right | 2.0 km || 
|-id=195 bgcolor=#fefefe
| 295195 ||  || — || March 31, 2008 || Kitt Peak || Spacewatch || — || align=right data-sort-value="0.80" | 800 m || 
|-id=196 bgcolor=#d6d6d6
| 295196 ||  || — || March 31, 2008 || Kitt Peak || Spacewatch || fast? || align=right | 4.7 km || 
|-id=197 bgcolor=#d6d6d6
| 295197 ||  || — || March 31, 2008 || Mount Lemmon || Mount Lemmon Survey || — || align=right | 2.5 km || 
|-id=198 bgcolor=#E9E9E9
| 295198 ||  || — || March 31, 2008 || Kitt Peak || Spacewatch || — || align=right data-sort-value="0.94" | 940 m || 
|-id=199 bgcolor=#C2FFFF
| 295199 ||  || — || March 31, 2008 || Kitt Peak || Spacewatch || L5 || align=right | 10 km || 
|-id=200 bgcolor=#fefefe
| 295200 ||  || — || March 31, 2008 || Kitt Peak || Spacewatch || — || align=right data-sort-value="0.67" | 670 m || 
|}

295201–295300 

|-bgcolor=#d6d6d6
| 295201 ||  || — || March 31, 2008 || Mount Lemmon || Mount Lemmon Survey || — || align=right | 2.7 km || 
|-id=202 bgcolor=#E9E9E9
| 295202 ||  || — || March 31, 2008 || Kitt Peak || Spacewatch || — || align=right | 1.8 km || 
|-id=203 bgcolor=#E9E9E9
| 295203 ||  || — || March 31, 2008 || Kitt Peak || Spacewatch || — || align=right | 1.5 km || 
|-id=204 bgcolor=#E9E9E9
| 295204 ||  || — || March 31, 2008 || Kitt Peak || Spacewatch || AEO || align=right | 1.3 km || 
|-id=205 bgcolor=#C2FFFF
| 295205 ||  || — || March 28, 2008 || Kitt Peak || Spacewatch || L5 || align=right | 9.3 km || 
|-id=206 bgcolor=#d6d6d6
| 295206 ||  || — || March 28, 2008 || Kitt Peak || Spacewatch || HYG || align=right | 2.6 km || 
|-id=207 bgcolor=#C2FFFF
| 295207 ||  || — || March 29, 2008 || Kitt Peak || Spacewatch || L5 || align=right | 11 km || 
|-id=208 bgcolor=#E9E9E9
| 295208 ||  || — || March 29, 2008 || Kitt Peak || Spacewatch || WIT || align=right | 1.1 km || 
|-id=209 bgcolor=#d6d6d6
| 295209 ||  || — || March 29, 2008 || Kitt Peak || Spacewatch || VER || align=right | 3.0 km || 
|-id=210 bgcolor=#d6d6d6
| 295210 ||  || — || March 29, 2008 || Mount Lemmon || Mount Lemmon Survey || — || align=right | 3.1 km || 
|-id=211 bgcolor=#E9E9E9
| 295211 ||  || — || March 30, 2008 || Kitt Peak || Spacewatch || KRM || align=right | 2.4 km || 
|-id=212 bgcolor=#fefefe
| 295212 ||  || — || March 28, 2008 || Mount Lemmon || Mount Lemmon Survey || FLO || align=right data-sort-value="0.65" | 650 m || 
|-id=213 bgcolor=#E9E9E9
| 295213 ||  || — || March 29, 2008 || Kitt Peak || Spacewatch || MRX || align=right | 1.1 km || 
|-id=214 bgcolor=#d6d6d6
| 295214 ||  || — || March 27, 2008 || Kitt Peak || Spacewatch || TEL || align=right | 1.9 km || 
|-id=215 bgcolor=#fefefe
| 295215 ||  || — || March 27, 2008 || Mount Lemmon || Mount Lemmon Survey || — || align=right | 1.3 km || 
|-id=216 bgcolor=#d6d6d6
| 295216 ||  || — || March 28, 2008 || Kitt Peak || Spacewatch || HYG || align=right | 3.3 km || 
|-id=217 bgcolor=#C2FFFF
| 295217 ||  || — || March 30, 2008 || Kitt Peak || Spacewatch || L5 || align=right | 12 km || 
|-id=218 bgcolor=#E9E9E9
| 295218 ||  || — || March 31, 2008 || Mount Lemmon || Mount Lemmon Survey || PAD || align=right | 1.6 km || 
|-id=219 bgcolor=#fefefe
| 295219 ||  || — || March 26, 2008 || Mount Lemmon || Mount Lemmon Survey || MAS || align=right data-sort-value="0.89" | 890 m || 
|-id=220 bgcolor=#E9E9E9
| 295220 ||  || — || March 30, 2008 || Kitt Peak || Spacewatch || JUN || align=right data-sort-value="0.88" | 880 m || 
|-id=221 bgcolor=#fefefe
| 295221 || 2008 GM || — || April 2, 2008 || La Sagra || OAM Obs. || — || align=right data-sort-value="0.77" | 770 m || 
|-id=222 bgcolor=#E9E9E9
| 295222 ||  || — || April 2, 2008 || La Sagra || OAM Obs. || — || align=right | 2.0 km || 
|-id=223 bgcolor=#fefefe
| 295223 ||  || — || April 1, 2008 || Kitt Peak || Spacewatch || NYS || align=right data-sort-value="0.79" | 790 m || 
|-id=224 bgcolor=#E9E9E9
| 295224 ||  || — || April 1, 2008 || Kitt Peak || Spacewatch || NEM || align=right | 2.3 km || 
|-id=225 bgcolor=#E9E9E9
| 295225 ||  || — || April 1, 2008 || Kitt Peak || Spacewatch || WIT || align=right | 1.1 km || 
|-id=226 bgcolor=#C2FFFF
| 295226 ||  || — || April 1, 2008 || Kitt Peak || Spacewatch || L5 || align=right | 13 km || 
|-id=227 bgcolor=#d6d6d6
| 295227 ||  || — || April 1, 2008 || Kitt Peak || Spacewatch || — || align=right | 3.5 km || 
|-id=228 bgcolor=#fefefe
| 295228 ||  || — || April 1, 2008 || Kitt Peak || Spacewatch || NYS || align=right data-sort-value="0.63" | 630 m || 
|-id=229 bgcolor=#fefefe
| 295229 ||  || — || April 1, 2008 || Kitt Peak || Spacewatch || MAS || align=right data-sort-value="0.70" | 700 m || 
|-id=230 bgcolor=#E9E9E9
| 295230 ||  || — || April 1, 2008 || Kitt Peak || Spacewatch || MIS || align=right | 2.6 km || 
|-id=231 bgcolor=#d6d6d6
| 295231 ||  || — || April 3, 2008 || Kitt Peak || Spacewatch || — || align=right | 4.6 km || 
|-id=232 bgcolor=#E9E9E9
| 295232 ||  || — || April 3, 2008 || Kitt Peak || Spacewatch || — || align=right | 1.5 km || 
|-id=233 bgcolor=#d6d6d6
| 295233 ||  || — || April 3, 2008 || Mount Lemmon || Mount Lemmon Survey || — || align=right | 3.0 km || 
|-id=234 bgcolor=#d6d6d6
| 295234 ||  || — || April 4, 2008 || Mount Lemmon || Mount Lemmon Survey || — || align=right | 3.9 km || 
|-id=235 bgcolor=#FA8072
| 295235 ||  || — || April 4, 2008 || Mount Lemmon || Mount Lemmon Survey || H || align=right data-sort-value="0.81" | 810 m || 
|-id=236 bgcolor=#fefefe
| 295236 ||  || — || April 4, 2008 || Mount Lemmon || Mount Lemmon Survey || — || align=right data-sort-value="0.83" | 830 m || 
|-id=237 bgcolor=#fefefe
| 295237 ||  || — || April 4, 2008 || Kitt Peak || Spacewatch || — || align=right data-sort-value="0.69" | 690 m || 
|-id=238 bgcolor=#fefefe
| 295238 ||  || — || April 3, 2008 || Socorro || LINEAR || — || align=right | 1.2 km || 
|-id=239 bgcolor=#fefefe
| 295239 ||  || — || April 11, 2008 || Desert Eagle || W. K. Y. Yeung || MAS || align=right data-sort-value="0.79" | 790 m || 
|-id=240 bgcolor=#d6d6d6
| 295240 ||  || — || April 1, 2008 || Mount Lemmon || Mount Lemmon Survey || — || align=right | 3.8 km || 
|-id=241 bgcolor=#d6d6d6
| 295241 ||  || — || April 1, 2008 || Mount Lemmon || Mount Lemmon Survey || — || align=right | 4.5 km || 
|-id=242 bgcolor=#d6d6d6
| 295242 ||  || — || April 1, 2008 || Mount Lemmon || Mount Lemmon Survey || — || align=right | 3.4 km || 
|-id=243 bgcolor=#fefefe
| 295243 ||  || — || April 1, 2008 || Catalina || CSS || PHO || align=right | 3.2 km || 
|-id=244 bgcolor=#E9E9E9
| 295244 ||  || — || April 3, 2008 || Kitt Peak || Spacewatch || — || align=right | 1.8 km || 
|-id=245 bgcolor=#E9E9E9
| 295245 ||  || — || April 3, 2008 || Kitt Peak || Spacewatch || — || align=right | 1.6 km || 
|-id=246 bgcolor=#d6d6d6
| 295246 ||  || — || April 3, 2008 || Mount Lemmon || Mount Lemmon Survey || EOS || align=right | 1.9 km || 
|-id=247 bgcolor=#E9E9E9
| 295247 ||  || — || April 3, 2008 || Kitt Peak || Spacewatch || — || align=right | 1.5 km || 
|-id=248 bgcolor=#d6d6d6
| 295248 ||  || — || April 3, 2008 || Mount Lemmon || Mount Lemmon Survey || — || align=right | 3.7 km || 
|-id=249 bgcolor=#E9E9E9
| 295249 ||  || — || April 3, 2008 || Mount Lemmon || Mount Lemmon Survey || — || align=right | 2.4 km || 
|-id=250 bgcolor=#fefefe
| 295250 ||  || — || April 3, 2008 || Mount Lemmon || Mount Lemmon Survey || FLO || align=right data-sort-value="0.61" | 610 m || 
|-id=251 bgcolor=#E9E9E9
| 295251 ||  || — || April 4, 2008 || Kitt Peak || Spacewatch || WIT || align=right | 1.00 km || 
|-id=252 bgcolor=#d6d6d6
| 295252 ||  || — || April 4, 2008 || Kitt Peak || Spacewatch || — || align=right | 5.0 km || 
|-id=253 bgcolor=#d6d6d6
| 295253 ||  || — || April 4, 2008 || Mount Lemmon || Mount Lemmon Survey || — || align=right | 3.0 km || 
|-id=254 bgcolor=#d6d6d6
| 295254 ||  || — || April 4, 2008 || Kitt Peak || Spacewatch || — || align=right | 3.3 km || 
|-id=255 bgcolor=#fefefe
| 295255 ||  || — || April 4, 2008 || Kitt Peak || Spacewatch || V || align=right data-sort-value="0.58" | 580 m || 
|-id=256 bgcolor=#C2FFFF
| 295256 ||  || — || April 5, 2008 || Kitt Peak || Spacewatch || L5 || align=right | 10 km || 
|-id=257 bgcolor=#E9E9E9
| 295257 ||  || — || April 5, 2008 || Mount Lemmon || Mount Lemmon Survey || HOF || align=right | 2.7 km || 
|-id=258 bgcolor=#E9E9E9
| 295258 ||  || — || April 5, 2008 || Mount Lemmon || Mount Lemmon Survey || HOF || align=right | 3.7 km || 
|-id=259 bgcolor=#E9E9E9
| 295259 ||  || — || April 5, 2008 || Mount Lemmon || Mount Lemmon Survey || — || align=right | 1.7 km || 
|-id=260 bgcolor=#E9E9E9
| 295260 ||  || — || April 5, 2008 || Mount Lemmon || Mount Lemmon Survey || — || align=right | 2.5 km || 
|-id=261 bgcolor=#d6d6d6
| 295261 ||  || — || April 5, 2008 || Mount Lemmon || Mount Lemmon Survey || — || align=right | 2.7 km || 
|-id=262 bgcolor=#E9E9E9
| 295262 ||  || — || April 5, 2008 || Kitt Peak || Spacewatch || — || align=right | 2.7 km || 
|-id=263 bgcolor=#E9E9E9
| 295263 ||  || — || April 5, 2008 || Kitt Peak || Spacewatch || — || align=right | 2.7 km || 
|-id=264 bgcolor=#d6d6d6
| 295264 ||  || — || April 6, 2008 || Kitt Peak || Spacewatch || — || align=right | 3.3 km || 
|-id=265 bgcolor=#d6d6d6
| 295265 ||  || — || April 6, 2008 || Mount Lemmon || Mount Lemmon Survey || VER || align=right | 2.8 km || 
|-id=266 bgcolor=#fefefe
| 295266 ||  || — || April 6, 2008 || Kitt Peak || Spacewatch || — || align=right | 1.1 km || 
|-id=267 bgcolor=#fefefe
| 295267 ||  || — || April 6, 2008 || Kitt Peak || Spacewatch || V || align=right data-sort-value="0.68" | 680 m || 
|-id=268 bgcolor=#d6d6d6
| 295268 ||  || — || April 6, 2008 || Kitt Peak || Spacewatch || — || align=right | 3.1 km || 
|-id=269 bgcolor=#d6d6d6
| 295269 ||  || — || April 6, 2008 || Kitt Peak || Spacewatch || — || align=right | 4.7 km || 
|-id=270 bgcolor=#E9E9E9
| 295270 ||  || — || April 7, 2008 || Mount Lemmon || Mount Lemmon Survey || — || align=right data-sort-value="0.76" | 760 m || 
|-id=271 bgcolor=#d6d6d6
| 295271 ||  || — || April 7, 2008 || Mount Lemmon || Mount Lemmon Survey || HYG || align=right | 2.6 km || 
|-id=272 bgcolor=#d6d6d6
| 295272 ||  || — || April 7, 2008 || Kitt Peak || Spacewatch || EOS || align=right | 2.2 km || 
|-id=273 bgcolor=#fefefe
| 295273 ||  || — || April 7, 2008 || Kitt Peak || Spacewatch || V || align=right data-sort-value="0.67" | 670 m || 
|-id=274 bgcolor=#E9E9E9
| 295274 ||  || — || April 7, 2008 || Kitt Peak || Spacewatch || MIS || align=right | 3.2 km || 
|-id=275 bgcolor=#fefefe
| 295275 ||  || — || April 7, 2008 || Kitt Peak || Spacewatch || NYS || align=right data-sort-value="0.81" | 810 m || 
|-id=276 bgcolor=#fefefe
| 295276 ||  || — || April 8, 2008 || Kitt Peak || Spacewatch || — || align=right data-sort-value="0.93" | 930 m || 
|-id=277 bgcolor=#fefefe
| 295277 ||  || — || April 8, 2008 || Kitt Peak || Spacewatch || — || align=right | 1.1 km || 
|-id=278 bgcolor=#fefefe
| 295278 ||  || — || April 5, 2008 || Mount Lemmon || Mount Lemmon Survey || V || align=right data-sort-value="0.71" | 710 m || 
|-id=279 bgcolor=#E9E9E9
| 295279 ||  || — || April 6, 2008 || Mount Lemmon || Mount Lemmon Survey || HEN || align=right | 1.1 km || 
|-id=280 bgcolor=#fefefe
| 295280 ||  || — || April 6, 2008 || Catalina || CSS || — || align=right | 1.0 km || 
|-id=281 bgcolor=#E9E9E9
| 295281 ||  || — || April 6, 2008 || Catalina || CSS || GEF || align=right | 2.1 km || 
|-id=282 bgcolor=#E9E9E9
| 295282 ||  || — || April 6, 2008 || Catalina || CSS || — || align=right | 3.3 km || 
|-id=283 bgcolor=#d6d6d6
| 295283 ||  || — || April 7, 2008 || Kitt Peak || Spacewatch || — || align=right | 3.6 km || 
|-id=284 bgcolor=#d6d6d6
| 295284 ||  || — || April 7, 2008 || Mount Lemmon || Mount Lemmon Survey || — || align=right | 4.1 km || 
|-id=285 bgcolor=#E9E9E9
| 295285 ||  || — || April 7, 2008 || Catalina || CSS || POS || align=right | 4.3 km || 
|-id=286 bgcolor=#fefefe
| 295286 ||  || — || April 8, 2008 || Kitt Peak || Spacewatch || — || align=right data-sort-value="0.77" | 770 m || 
|-id=287 bgcolor=#d6d6d6
| 295287 ||  || — || April 9, 2008 || Kitt Peak || Spacewatch || — || align=right | 3.1 km || 
|-id=288 bgcolor=#E9E9E9
| 295288 ||  || — || April 10, 2008 || Kitt Peak || Spacewatch || — || align=right | 3.4 km || 
|-id=289 bgcolor=#d6d6d6
| 295289 ||  || — || April 10, 2008 || Kitt Peak || Spacewatch || — || align=right | 4.0 km || 
|-id=290 bgcolor=#E9E9E9
| 295290 ||  || — || April 10, 2008 || Kitt Peak || Spacewatch || — || align=right | 2.6 km || 
|-id=291 bgcolor=#E9E9E9
| 295291 ||  || — || April 11, 2008 || Kitt Peak || Spacewatch || — || align=right | 2.7 km || 
|-id=292 bgcolor=#fefefe
| 295292 ||  || — || April 11, 2008 || Kitt Peak || Spacewatch || — || align=right data-sort-value="0.93" | 930 m || 
|-id=293 bgcolor=#d6d6d6
| 295293 ||  || — || April 11, 2008 || Catalina || CSS || CHA || align=right | 2.6 km || 
|-id=294 bgcolor=#E9E9E9
| 295294 ||  || — || April 11, 2008 || Mount Lemmon || Mount Lemmon Survey || — || align=right | 1.9 km || 
|-id=295 bgcolor=#E9E9E9
| 295295 ||  || — || April 11, 2008 || Mount Lemmon || Mount Lemmon Survey || — || align=right | 1.2 km || 
|-id=296 bgcolor=#E9E9E9
| 295296 ||  || — || April 13, 2008 || Mount Lemmon || Mount Lemmon Survey || — || align=right data-sort-value="0.97" | 970 m || 
|-id=297 bgcolor=#fefefe
| 295297 ||  || — || April 13, 2008 || Kitt Peak || Spacewatch || — || align=right | 1.2 km || 
|-id=298 bgcolor=#fefefe
| 295298 ||  || — || April 8, 2008 || Socorro || LINEAR || — || align=right | 1.5 km || 
|-id=299 bgcolor=#E9E9E9
| 295299 Nannidiana ||  ||  || April 15, 2008 || Charleston || R. Holmes || EUN || align=right | 1.7 km || 
|-id=300 bgcolor=#d6d6d6
| 295300 ||  || — || April 10, 2008 || Catalina || CSS || — || align=right | 6.7 km || 
|}

295301–295400 

|-bgcolor=#E9E9E9
| 295301 ||  || — || April 13, 2008 || Catalina || CSS || EUN || align=right | 1.6 km || 
|-id=302 bgcolor=#d6d6d6
| 295302 ||  || — || April 14, 2008 || Catalina || CSS || — || align=right | 5.8 km || 
|-id=303 bgcolor=#d6d6d6
| 295303 ||  || — || April 11, 2008 || Kitt Peak || Spacewatch || — || align=right | 3.9 km || 
|-id=304 bgcolor=#d6d6d6
| 295304 ||  || — || April 11, 2008 || Kitt Peak || Spacewatch || — || align=right | 5.1 km || 
|-id=305 bgcolor=#d6d6d6
| 295305 ||  || — || April 11, 2008 || Catalina || CSS || — || align=right | 4.3 km || 
|-id=306 bgcolor=#d6d6d6
| 295306 ||  || — || April 11, 2008 || Kitt Peak || Spacewatch || — || align=right | 4.0 km || 
|-id=307 bgcolor=#d6d6d6
| 295307 ||  || — || April 12, 2008 || Catalina || CSS || LUT || align=right | 6.5 km || 
|-id=308 bgcolor=#E9E9E9
| 295308 ||  || — || April 13, 2008 || Kitt Peak || Spacewatch || MIS || align=right | 3.1 km || 
|-id=309 bgcolor=#d6d6d6
| 295309 ||  || — || April 13, 2008 || Mount Lemmon || Mount Lemmon Survey || HYG || align=right | 3.1 km || 
|-id=310 bgcolor=#E9E9E9
| 295310 ||  || — || April 14, 2008 || Mount Lemmon || Mount Lemmon Survey || — || align=right | 1.3 km || 
|-id=311 bgcolor=#E9E9E9
| 295311 ||  || — || April 14, 2008 || Mount Lemmon || Mount Lemmon Survey || — || align=right | 1.4 km || 
|-id=312 bgcolor=#d6d6d6
| 295312 ||  || — || April 1, 2008 || Kitt Peak || Spacewatch || — || align=right | 2.8 km || 
|-id=313 bgcolor=#fefefe
| 295313 ||  || — || April 5, 2008 || Catalina || CSS || V || align=right data-sort-value="0.82" | 820 m || 
|-id=314 bgcolor=#E9E9E9
| 295314 ||  || — || April 5, 2008 || Kitt Peak || Spacewatch || RAF || align=right data-sort-value="0.86" | 860 m || 
|-id=315 bgcolor=#C2FFFF
| 295315 ||  || — || April 4, 2008 || Kitt Peak || Spacewatch || L5 || align=right | 14 km || 
|-id=316 bgcolor=#d6d6d6
| 295316 ||  || — || April 15, 2008 || Kitt Peak || Spacewatch || — || align=right | 2.7 km || 
|-id=317 bgcolor=#E9E9E9
| 295317 ||  || — || April 3, 2008 || Kitt Peak || Spacewatch || — || align=right | 1.6 km || 
|-id=318 bgcolor=#d6d6d6
| 295318 ||  || — || April 5, 2008 || Kitt Peak || Spacewatch || SYL7:4 || align=right | 4.6 km || 
|-id=319 bgcolor=#fefefe
| 295319 ||  || — || April 3, 2008 || Kitt Peak || Spacewatch || — || align=right data-sort-value="0.64" | 640 m || 
|-id=320 bgcolor=#d6d6d6
| 295320 ||  || — || April 3, 2008 || Mount Lemmon || Mount Lemmon Survey || HYG || align=right | 2.9 km || 
|-id=321 bgcolor=#E9E9E9
| 295321 ||  || — || April 7, 2008 || Kitt Peak || Spacewatch || — || align=right | 2.4 km || 
|-id=322 bgcolor=#E9E9E9
| 295322 ||  || — || April 4, 2008 || Kitt Peak || Spacewatch || — || align=right | 1.8 km || 
|-id=323 bgcolor=#C2FFFF
| 295323 ||  || — || April 11, 2008 || Mount Lemmon || Mount Lemmon Survey || L5 || align=right | 12 km || 
|-id=324 bgcolor=#d6d6d6
| 295324 ||  || — || April 14, 2008 || Mount Lemmon || Mount Lemmon Survey || VER || align=right | 3.3 km || 
|-id=325 bgcolor=#E9E9E9
| 295325 ||  || — || April 6, 2008 || Catalina || CSS || — || align=right | 2.4 km || 
|-id=326 bgcolor=#C2FFFF
| 295326 ||  || — || April 1, 2008 || Mount Lemmon || Mount Lemmon Survey || L5 || align=right | 12 km || 
|-id=327 bgcolor=#fefefe
| 295327 ||  || — || April 5, 2008 || Socorro || LINEAR || — || align=right | 1.5 km || 
|-id=328 bgcolor=#d6d6d6
| 295328 ||  || — || April 24, 2008 || Mount Lemmon || Mount Lemmon Survey || — || align=right | 2.5 km || 
|-id=329 bgcolor=#C2FFFF
| 295329 ||  || — || April 24, 2008 || Andrushivka || Andrushivka Obs. || L5 || align=right | 13 km || 
|-id=330 bgcolor=#d6d6d6
| 295330 ||  || — || April 25, 2008 || La Sagra || OAM Obs. || HYG || align=right | 3.4 km || 
|-id=331 bgcolor=#d6d6d6
| 295331 ||  || — || April 28, 2008 || La Sagra || OAM Obs. || — || align=right | 3.7 km || 
|-id=332 bgcolor=#fefefe
| 295332 ||  || — || April 29, 2008 || La Sagra || OAM Obs. || — || align=right data-sort-value="0.80" | 800 m || 
|-id=333 bgcolor=#d6d6d6
| 295333 ||  || — || April 24, 2008 || Kitt Peak || Spacewatch || — || align=right | 2.9 km || 
|-id=334 bgcolor=#d6d6d6
| 295334 ||  || — || April 24, 2008 || Kitt Peak || Spacewatch || EOS || align=right | 2.0 km || 
|-id=335 bgcolor=#E9E9E9
| 295335 ||  || — || April 24, 2008 || Mount Lemmon || Mount Lemmon Survey || — || align=right | 2.4 km || 
|-id=336 bgcolor=#C2FFFF
| 295336 ||  || — || April 24, 2008 || Kitt Peak || Spacewatch || L5 || align=right | 13 km || 
|-id=337 bgcolor=#C2FFFF
| 295337 ||  || — || April 24, 2008 || Kitt Peak || Spacewatch || L5 || align=right | 10 km || 
|-id=338 bgcolor=#fefefe
| 295338 ||  || — || April 24, 2008 || Kitt Peak || Spacewatch || MAS || align=right data-sort-value="0.84" | 840 m || 
|-id=339 bgcolor=#fefefe
| 295339 ||  || — || April 24, 2008 || Kitt Peak || Spacewatch || MAS || align=right data-sort-value="0.78" | 780 m || 
|-id=340 bgcolor=#C2FFFF
| 295340 ||  || — || April 24, 2008 || Kitt Peak || Spacewatch || L5 || align=right | 11 km || 
|-id=341 bgcolor=#fefefe
| 295341 ||  || — || April 25, 2008 || Kitt Peak || Spacewatch || — || align=right data-sort-value="0.77" | 770 m || 
|-id=342 bgcolor=#C2FFFF
| 295342 ||  || — || April 25, 2008 || Kitt Peak || Spacewatch || L5 || align=right | 10 km || 
|-id=343 bgcolor=#E9E9E9
| 295343 ||  || — || April 25, 2008 || Mount Lemmon || Mount Lemmon Survey || — || align=right | 1.7 km || 
|-id=344 bgcolor=#fefefe
| 295344 ||  || — || April 26, 2008 || Kitt Peak || Spacewatch || — || align=right | 1.2 km || 
|-id=345 bgcolor=#d6d6d6
| 295345 ||  || — || April 26, 2008 || Kitt Peak || Spacewatch || — || align=right | 3.5 km || 
|-id=346 bgcolor=#E9E9E9
| 295346 ||  || — || April 26, 2008 || Mount Lemmon || Mount Lemmon Survey || — || align=right | 3.4 km || 
|-id=347 bgcolor=#C2FFFF
| 295347 ||  || — || April 27, 2008 || Kitt Peak || Spacewatch || L5 || align=right | 12 km || 
|-id=348 bgcolor=#d6d6d6
| 295348 ||  || — || April 27, 2008 || Kitt Peak || Spacewatch || — || align=right | 3.3 km || 
|-id=349 bgcolor=#E9E9E9
| 295349 ||  || — || April 28, 2008 || Kitt Peak || Spacewatch || MRX || align=right | 1.3 km || 
|-id=350 bgcolor=#fefefe
| 295350 ||  || — || April 28, 2008 || Kitt Peak || Spacewatch || MAS || align=right data-sort-value="0.76" | 760 m || 
|-id=351 bgcolor=#d6d6d6
| 295351 ||  || — || December 6, 2005 || Mount Lemmon || Mount Lemmon Survey || — || align=right | 3.6 km || 
|-id=352 bgcolor=#fefefe
| 295352 ||  || — || April 29, 2008 || Mount Lemmon || Mount Lemmon Survey || FLO || align=right data-sort-value="0.67" | 670 m || 
|-id=353 bgcolor=#fefefe
| 295353 ||  || — || April 25, 2008 || Kitt Peak || Spacewatch || — || align=right data-sort-value="0.97" | 970 m || 
|-id=354 bgcolor=#E9E9E9
| 295354 ||  || — || April 26, 2008 || Kitt Peak || Spacewatch || — || align=right | 1.9 km || 
|-id=355 bgcolor=#d6d6d6
| 295355 ||  || — || April 26, 2008 || Kitt Peak || Spacewatch || — || align=right | 3.4 km || 
|-id=356 bgcolor=#d6d6d6
| 295356 ||  || — || April 29, 2008 || Kitt Peak || Spacewatch || — || align=right | 5.3 km || 
|-id=357 bgcolor=#E9E9E9
| 295357 ||  || — || April 29, 2008 || Mount Lemmon || Mount Lemmon Survey || — || align=right | 1.7 km || 
|-id=358 bgcolor=#d6d6d6
| 295358 ||  || — || April 29, 2008 || Mount Lemmon || Mount Lemmon Survey || — || align=right | 2.5 km || 
|-id=359 bgcolor=#fefefe
| 295359 ||  || — || April 30, 2008 || Kitt Peak || Spacewatch || — || align=right data-sort-value="0.92" | 920 m || 
|-id=360 bgcolor=#E9E9E9
| 295360 ||  || — || April 26, 2008 || Mount Lemmon || Mount Lemmon Survey || — || align=right | 1.1 km || 
|-id=361 bgcolor=#E9E9E9
| 295361 ||  || — || April 28, 2008 || Kitt Peak || Spacewatch || — || align=right | 1.6 km || 
|-id=362 bgcolor=#E9E9E9
| 295362 ||  || — || April 29, 2008 || Kitt Peak || Spacewatch || JUN || align=right | 1.2 km || 
|-id=363 bgcolor=#fefefe
| 295363 ||  || — || April 29, 2008 || Kitt Peak || Spacewatch || — || align=right data-sort-value="0.84" | 840 m || 
|-id=364 bgcolor=#d6d6d6
| 295364 ||  || — || April 29, 2008 || Kitt Peak || Spacewatch || KOR || align=right | 1.5 km || 
|-id=365 bgcolor=#d6d6d6
| 295365 ||  || — || April 29, 2008 || Kitt Peak || Spacewatch || — || align=right | 3.3 km || 
|-id=366 bgcolor=#E9E9E9
| 295366 ||  || — || April 29, 2008 || Kitt Peak || Spacewatch || MIT || align=right | 3.3 km || 
|-id=367 bgcolor=#d6d6d6
| 295367 ||  || — || April 29, 2008 || Kitt Peak || Spacewatch || JLI || align=right | 3.0 km || 
|-id=368 bgcolor=#d6d6d6
| 295368 ||  || — || April 29, 2008 || Kitt Peak || Spacewatch || — || align=right | 2.2 km || 
|-id=369 bgcolor=#fefefe
| 295369 ||  || — || April 29, 2008 || Mount Lemmon || Mount Lemmon Survey || NYS || align=right data-sort-value="0.75" | 750 m || 
|-id=370 bgcolor=#d6d6d6
| 295370 ||  || — || April 29, 2008 || Kitt Peak || Spacewatch || ARM || align=right | 4.6 km || 
|-id=371 bgcolor=#E9E9E9
| 295371 ||  || — || April 29, 2008 || Kitt Peak || Spacewatch || — || align=right | 1.6 km || 
|-id=372 bgcolor=#C2FFFF
| 295372 ||  || — || April 30, 2008 || Kitt Peak || Spacewatch || L5 || align=right | 9.3 km || 
|-id=373 bgcolor=#d6d6d6
| 295373 ||  || — || April 28, 2008 || Mount Lemmon || Mount Lemmon Survey || — || align=right | 5.1 km || 
|-id=374 bgcolor=#E9E9E9
| 295374 ||  || — || April 29, 2008 || Mount Lemmon || Mount Lemmon Survey || — || align=right | 1.7 km || 
|-id=375 bgcolor=#d6d6d6
| 295375 ||  || — || April 30, 2008 || Kitt Peak || Spacewatch || HYG || align=right | 3.1 km || 
|-id=376 bgcolor=#d6d6d6
| 295376 ||  || — || April 29, 2008 || Mount Lemmon || Mount Lemmon Survey || — || align=right | 2.5 km || 
|-id=377 bgcolor=#FA8072
| 295377 ||  || — || April 29, 2008 || Catalina || CSS || — || align=right data-sort-value="0.91" | 910 m || 
|-id=378 bgcolor=#E9E9E9
| 295378 ||  || — || April 29, 2008 || Socorro || LINEAR || — || align=right | 2.5 km || 
|-id=379 bgcolor=#E9E9E9
| 295379 ||  || — || April 29, 2008 || Socorro || LINEAR || ADE || align=right | 3.0 km || 
|-id=380 bgcolor=#d6d6d6
| 295380 ||  || — || April 29, 2008 || Socorro || LINEAR || LIX || align=right | 4.8 km || 
|-id=381 bgcolor=#d6d6d6
| 295381 ||  || — || April 24, 2008 || Kitt Peak || Spacewatch || — || align=right | 3.2 km || 
|-id=382 bgcolor=#d6d6d6
| 295382 ||  || — || April 29, 2008 || Mount Lemmon || Mount Lemmon Survey || THM || align=right | 2.9 km || 
|-id=383 bgcolor=#C2FFFF
| 295383 ||  || — || April 30, 2008 || Mount Lemmon || Mount Lemmon Survey || L5 || align=right | 10 km || 
|-id=384 bgcolor=#E9E9E9
| 295384 ||  || — || May 2, 2008 || Catalina || CSS || — || align=right | 2.6 km || 
|-id=385 bgcolor=#E9E9E9
| 295385 ||  || — || May 2, 2008 || Bergisch Gladbach || W. Bickel || — || align=right | 3.3 km || 
|-id=386 bgcolor=#d6d6d6
| 295386 ||  || — || May 1, 2008 || Kitt Peak || Spacewatch || EOS || align=right | 2.9 km || 
|-id=387 bgcolor=#d6d6d6
| 295387 ||  || — || May 2, 2008 || Catalina || CSS || — || align=right | 2.6 km || 
|-id=388 bgcolor=#fefefe
| 295388 ||  || — || May 3, 2008 || Kitt Peak || Spacewatch || — || align=right | 1.3 km || 
|-id=389 bgcolor=#fefefe
| 295389 ||  || — || May 3, 2008 || Mount Lemmon || Mount Lemmon Survey || — || align=right data-sort-value="0.82" | 820 m || 
|-id=390 bgcolor=#d6d6d6
| 295390 ||  || — || May 2, 2008 || Kitt Peak || Spacewatch || — || align=right | 3.4 km || 
|-id=391 bgcolor=#E9E9E9
| 295391 ||  || — || May 2, 2008 || Kitt Peak || Spacewatch || AGN || align=right | 1.3 km || 
|-id=392 bgcolor=#fefefe
| 295392 ||  || — || May 2, 2008 || Kitt Peak || Spacewatch || — || align=right data-sort-value="0.80" | 800 m || 
|-id=393 bgcolor=#d6d6d6
| 295393 ||  || — || May 2, 2008 || Kitt Peak || Spacewatch || EOS || align=right | 2.5 km || 
|-id=394 bgcolor=#E9E9E9
| 295394 ||  || — || May 2, 2008 || Kitt Peak || Spacewatch || — || align=right | 3.4 km || 
|-id=395 bgcolor=#C2FFFF
| 295395 ||  || — || May 3, 2008 || Mount Lemmon || Mount Lemmon Survey || L5 || align=right | 11 km || 
|-id=396 bgcolor=#d6d6d6
| 295396 ||  || — || May 5, 2008 || Mount Lemmon || Mount Lemmon Survey || HIL3:2 || align=right | 7.5 km || 
|-id=397 bgcolor=#E9E9E9
| 295397 ||  || — || May 1, 2008 || Catalina || CSS || — || align=right | 2.4 km || 
|-id=398 bgcolor=#fefefe
| 295398 ||  || — || May 1, 2008 || Catalina || CSS || — || align=right | 1.3 km || 
|-id=399 bgcolor=#E9E9E9
| 295399 ||  || — || May 1, 2008 || Catalina || CSS || — || align=right | 1.3 km || 
|-id=400 bgcolor=#E9E9E9
| 295400 ||  || — || May 3, 2008 || Kitt Peak || Spacewatch || — || align=right | 1.6 km || 
|}

295401–295500 

|-bgcolor=#E9E9E9
| 295401 ||  || — || May 3, 2008 || Kitt Peak || Spacewatch || GEF || align=right | 1.2 km || 
|-id=402 bgcolor=#E9E9E9
| 295402 ||  || — || May 3, 2008 || Kitt Peak || Spacewatch || HEN || align=right | 1.0 km || 
|-id=403 bgcolor=#d6d6d6
| 295403 ||  || — || May 6, 2008 || Mount Lemmon || Mount Lemmon Survey || — || align=right | 3.1 km || 
|-id=404 bgcolor=#d6d6d6
| 295404 ||  || — || May 2, 2008 || Kitt Peak || Spacewatch || — || align=right | 3.2 km || 
|-id=405 bgcolor=#E9E9E9
| 295405 ||  || — || May 3, 2008 || Kitt Peak || Spacewatch || — || align=right data-sort-value="0.92" | 920 m || 
|-id=406 bgcolor=#fefefe
| 295406 ||  || — || May 9, 2008 || Siding Spring || SSS || H || align=right data-sort-value="0.88" | 880 m || 
|-id=407 bgcolor=#fefefe
| 295407 ||  || — || May 9, 2008 || Grove Creek || F. Tozzi || — || align=right | 1.3 km || 
|-id=408 bgcolor=#d6d6d6
| 295408 ||  || — || May 10, 2008 || Bergisch Gladbac || W. Bickel || — || align=right | 4.2 km || 
|-id=409 bgcolor=#E9E9E9
| 295409 ||  || — || May 6, 2008 || Siding Spring || SSS || — || align=right | 1.4 km || 
|-id=410 bgcolor=#d6d6d6
| 295410 ||  || — || May 11, 2008 || Catalina || CSS || — || align=right | 4.4 km || 
|-id=411 bgcolor=#d6d6d6
| 295411 ||  || — || May 8, 2008 || Kitt Peak || Spacewatch || — || align=right | 2.9 km || 
|-id=412 bgcolor=#C2FFFF
| 295412 ||  || — || May 8, 2008 || Kitt Peak || Spacewatch || L5 || align=right | 13 km || 
|-id=413 bgcolor=#C2FFFF
| 295413 ||  || — || May 11, 2008 || Kitt Peak || Spacewatch || L5 || align=right | 11 km || 
|-id=414 bgcolor=#d6d6d6
| 295414 ||  || — || May 5, 2008 || Catalina || CSS || — || align=right | 7.7 km || 
|-id=415 bgcolor=#E9E9E9
| 295415 ||  || — || May 2, 2008 || Kitt Peak || Spacewatch || — || align=right | 1.7 km || 
|-id=416 bgcolor=#fefefe
| 295416 ||  || — || May 3, 2008 || Mount Lemmon || Mount Lemmon Survey || NYS || align=right data-sort-value="0.71" | 710 m || 
|-id=417 bgcolor=#E9E9E9
| 295417 ||  || — || May 6, 2008 || Siding Spring || SSS || — || align=right | 2.8 km || 
|-id=418 bgcolor=#d6d6d6
| 295418 ||  || — || May 5, 2008 || Mount Lemmon || Mount Lemmon Survey || — || align=right | 3.2 km || 
|-id=419 bgcolor=#fefefe
| 295419 ||  || — || May 27, 2008 || Kitt Peak || Spacewatch || V || align=right data-sort-value="0.56" | 560 m || 
|-id=420 bgcolor=#d6d6d6
| 295420 ||  || — || May 27, 2008 || Kitt Peak || Spacewatch || — || align=right | 3.9 km || 
|-id=421 bgcolor=#E9E9E9
| 295421 ||  || — || May 28, 2008 || Kitt Peak || Spacewatch || — || align=right | 2.5 km || 
|-id=422 bgcolor=#E9E9E9
| 295422 ||  || — || May 27, 2008 || Kitt Peak || Spacewatch || — || align=right | 1.5 km || 
|-id=423 bgcolor=#E9E9E9
| 295423 ||  || — || May 27, 2008 || Kitt Peak || Spacewatch || — || align=right | 1.7 km || 
|-id=424 bgcolor=#E9E9E9
| 295424 ||  || — || May 29, 2008 || Mount Lemmon || Mount Lemmon Survey || — || align=right | 1.6 km || 
|-id=425 bgcolor=#d6d6d6
| 295425 ||  || — || May 29, 2008 || Kitt Peak || Spacewatch || EMA || align=right | 5.7 km || 
|-id=426 bgcolor=#E9E9E9
| 295426 ||  || — || May 29, 2008 || Kitt Peak || Spacewatch || JUN || align=right | 1.5 km || 
|-id=427 bgcolor=#FA8072
| 295427 ||  || — || May 29, 2008 || Kitt Peak || Spacewatch || — || align=right | 1.1 km || 
|-id=428 bgcolor=#d6d6d6
| 295428 ||  || — || May 29, 2008 || Kitt Peak || Spacewatch || — || align=right | 3.7 km || 
|-id=429 bgcolor=#E9E9E9
| 295429 ||  || — || May 29, 2008 || Kitt Peak || Spacewatch || — || align=right | 2.1 km || 
|-id=430 bgcolor=#fefefe
| 295430 ||  || — || May 29, 2008 || Mount Lemmon || Mount Lemmon Survey || FLO || align=right data-sort-value="0.59" | 590 m || 
|-id=431 bgcolor=#C2FFFF
| 295431 ||  || — || May 29, 2008 || Kitt Peak || Spacewatch || L5 || align=right | 13 km || 
|-id=432 bgcolor=#C2FFFF
| 295432 ||  || — || May 30, 2008 || Kitt Peak || Spacewatch || L5 || align=right | 12 km || 
|-id=433 bgcolor=#E9E9E9
| 295433 ||  || — || May 30, 2008 || Kitt Peak || Spacewatch || — || align=right | 1.5 km || 
|-id=434 bgcolor=#d6d6d6
| 295434 ||  || — || May 29, 2008 || Mount Lemmon || Mount Lemmon Survey || VER || align=right | 2.5 km || 
|-id=435 bgcolor=#E9E9E9
| 295435 ||  || — || May 30, 2008 || Kitt Peak || Spacewatch || — || align=right | 1.0 km || 
|-id=436 bgcolor=#d6d6d6
| 295436 ||  || — || June 3, 2008 || Mount Lemmon || Mount Lemmon Survey || — || align=right | 4.3 km || 
|-id=437 bgcolor=#C2FFFF
| 295437 ||  || — || June 3, 2008 || Kitt Peak || Spacewatch || L5 || align=right | 9.7 km || 
|-id=438 bgcolor=#E9E9E9
| 295438 ||  || — || June 6, 2008 || Kitt Peak || Spacewatch || HOF || align=right | 3.0 km || 
|-id=439 bgcolor=#d6d6d6
| 295439 ||  || — || June 6, 2008 || Kitt Peak || Spacewatch || EOS || align=right | 3.0 km || 
|-id=440 bgcolor=#d6d6d6
| 295440 ||  || — || June 7, 2008 || Kitt Peak || Spacewatch || — || align=right | 3.7 km || 
|-id=441 bgcolor=#fefefe
| 295441 ||  || — || June 10, 2008 || Kitt Peak || Spacewatch || — || align=right | 1.3 km || 
|-id=442 bgcolor=#E9E9E9
| 295442 ||  || — || June 15, 2008 || Wrightwood || J. W. Young || — || align=right | 1.2 km || 
|-id=443 bgcolor=#E9E9E9
| 295443 ||  || — || June 24, 2008 || Siding Spring || SSS || — || align=right | 2.6 km || 
|-id=444 bgcolor=#d6d6d6
| 295444 || 2008 MN || — || June 24, 2008 || Skylive Obs. || F. Tozzi || Tj (2.93) || align=right | 4.7 km || 
|-id=445 bgcolor=#d6d6d6
| 295445 ||  || — || July 1, 2008 || Kitt Peak || Spacewatch || — || align=right | 2.9 km || 
|-id=446 bgcolor=#d6d6d6
| 295446 ||  || — || July 28, 2008 || La Sagra || OAM Obs. || — || align=right | 6.4 km || 
|-id=447 bgcolor=#d6d6d6
| 295447 ||  || — || July 29, 2008 || Kitt Peak || Spacewatch || — || align=right | 2.7 km || 
|-id=448 bgcolor=#d6d6d6
| 295448 ||  || — || July 30, 2008 || Kitt Peak || Spacewatch || KOR || align=right | 1.3 km || 
|-id=449 bgcolor=#C2FFFF
| 295449 ||  || — || July 29, 2008 || Kitt Peak || Spacewatch || L4 || align=right | 8.6 km || 
|-id=450 bgcolor=#d6d6d6
| 295450 ||  || — || July 30, 2008 || Kitt Peak || Spacewatch || — || align=right | 5.1 km || 
|-id=451 bgcolor=#E9E9E9
| 295451 ||  || — || July 30, 2008 || Kitt Peak || Spacewatch || — || align=right | 1.7 km || 
|-id=452 bgcolor=#d6d6d6
| 295452 ||  || — || July 30, 2008 || Kitt Peak || Spacewatch || KOR || align=right | 1.5 km || 
|-id=453 bgcolor=#E9E9E9
| 295453 ||  || — || July 30, 2008 || Mount Lemmon || Mount Lemmon Survey || — || align=right | 1.5 km || 
|-id=454 bgcolor=#E9E9E9
| 295454 ||  || — || August 2, 2008 || La Sagra || OAM Obs. || — || align=right | 1.7 km || 
|-id=455 bgcolor=#fefefe
| 295455 ||  || — || August 3, 2008 || Socorro || LINEAR || — || align=right | 4.1 km || 
|-id=456 bgcolor=#E9E9E9
| 295456 ||  || — || August 5, 2008 || La Sagra || OAM Obs. || IAN || align=right | 1.2 km || 
|-id=457 bgcolor=#fefefe
| 295457 ||  || — || August 5, 2008 || La Sagra || OAM Obs. || V || align=right data-sort-value="0.99" | 990 m || 
|-id=458 bgcolor=#d6d6d6
| 295458 ||  || — || August 4, 2008 || La Sagra || OAM Obs. || MEL || align=right | 4.8 km || 
|-id=459 bgcolor=#d6d6d6
| 295459 ||  || — || August 5, 2008 || La Sagra || OAM Obs. || EUP || align=right | 4.1 km || 
|-id=460 bgcolor=#d6d6d6
| 295460 ||  || — || August 9, 2008 || La Sagra || OAM Obs. || LAU || align=right | 1.4 km || 
|-id=461 bgcolor=#d6d6d6
| 295461 ||  || — || August 9, 2008 || La Sagra || OAM Obs. || CHA || align=right | 2.7 km || 
|-id=462 bgcolor=#E9E9E9
| 295462 ||  || — || August 10, 2008 || Dauban || F. Kugel || — || align=right | 1.1 km || 
|-id=463 bgcolor=#fefefe
| 295463 ||  || — || August 7, 2008 || Kitt Peak || Spacewatch || — || align=right data-sort-value="0.86" | 860 m || 
|-id=464 bgcolor=#d6d6d6
| 295464 ||  || — || August 23, 2008 || La Sagra || OAM Obs. || — || align=right | 3.0 km || 
|-id=465 bgcolor=#d6d6d6
| 295465 ||  || — || August 23, 2008 || La Sagra || OAM Obs. || — || align=right | 3.0 km || 
|-id=466 bgcolor=#E9E9E9
| 295466 ||  || — || August 24, 2008 || La Sagra || OAM Obs. || — || align=right | 2.6 km || 
|-id=467 bgcolor=#fefefe
| 295467 ||  || — || August 25, 2008 || Sandlot || G. Hug || — || align=right data-sort-value="0.92" | 920 m || 
|-id=468 bgcolor=#E9E9E9
| 295468 ||  || — || August 22, 2008 || Kitt Peak || Spacewatch || JUN || align=right | 1.6 km || 
|-id=469 bgcolor=#E9E9E9
| 295469 ||  || — || August 26, 2008 || Hibiscus || S. F. Hönig, N. Teamo || GER || align=right | 1.9 km || 
|-id=470 bgcolor=#fefefe
| 295470 ||  || — || August 26, 2008 || La Sagra || OAM Obs. || — || align=right | 1.4 km || 
|-id=471 bgcolor=#E9E9E9
| 295471 Herbertnitsch ||  ||  || August 27, 2008 || Vallemare di Borbona || V. S. Casulli || — || align=right | 2.5 km || 
|-id=472 bgcolor=#E9E9E9
| 295472 Puy ||  ||  || August 26, 2008 || Pises || Pises Obs. || — || align=right | 2.7 km || 
|-id=473 bgcolor=#d6d6d6
| 295473 Cochard ||  ||  || August 27, 2008 || Pises || J.-M. Lopez, C. Cavadore || — || align=right | 2.8 km || 
|-id=474 bgcolor=#fefefe
| 295474 ||  || — || August 28, 2008 || Vicques || M. Ory || — || align=right | 1.1 km || 
|-id=475 bgcolor=#E9E9E9
| 295475 ||  || — || August 28, 2008 || Pla D'Arguines || R. Ferrando || EUN || align=right | 1.0 km || 
|-id=476 bgcolor=#d6d6d6
| 295476 ||  || — || August 29, 2008 || Taunus || E. Schwab, R. Kling || — || align=right | 3.5 km || 
|-id=477 bgcolor=#E9E9E9
| 295477 ||  || — || August 29, 2008 || La Sagra || OAM Obs. || — || align=right | 2.4 km || 
|-id=478 bgcolor=#d6d6d6
| 295478 ||  || — || August 30, 2008 || La Sagra || OAM Obs. || VER || align=right | 3.8 km || 
|-id=479 bgcolor=#E9E9E9
| 295479 ||  || — || August 30, 2008 || Socorro || LINEAR || — || align=right | 2.7 km || 
|-id=480 bgcolor=#d6d6d6
| 295480 ||  || — || August 21, 2008 || Kitt Peak || Spacewatch || — || align=right | 2.5 km || 
|-id=481 bgcolor=#C2FFFF
| 295481 ||  || — || August 21, 2008 || Kitt Peak || Spacewatch || L4 || align=right | 12 km || 
|-id=482 bgcolor=#d6d6d6
| 295482 ||  || — || August 22, 2008 || Kitt Peak || Spacewatch || — || align=right | 3.9 km || 
|-id=483 bgcolor=#E9E9E9
| 295483 ||  || — || August 24, 2008 || Kitt Peak || Spacewatch || — || align=right | 3.1 km || 
|-id=484 bgcolor=#E9E9E9
| 295484 ||  || — || August 23, 2008 || Socorro || LINEAR || — || align=right | 1.3 km || 
|-id=485 bgcolor=#d6d6d6
| 295485 ||  || — || August 26, 2008 || Socorro || LINEAR || EOS || align=right | 3.0 km || 
|-id=486 bgcolor=#d6d6d6
| 295486 ||  || — || September 2, 2008 || Kitt Peak || Spacewatch || — || align=right | 3.3 km || 
|-id=487 bgcolor=#d6d6d6
| 295487 ||  || — || September 2, 2008 || Kitt Peak || Spacewatch || — || align=right | 2.8 km || 
|-id=488 bgcolor=#C2FFFF
| 295488 ||  || — || September 4, 2008 || Kitt Peak || Spacewatch || L4 || align=right | 9.6 km || 
|-id=489 bgcolor=#E9E9E9
| 295489 ||  || — || September 4, 2008 || Kitt Peak || Spacewatch || — || align=right | 1.8 km || 
|-id=490 bgcolor=#C2FFFF
| 295490 ||  || — || September 4, 2008 || Kitt Peak || Spacewatch || L4 || align=right | 10 km || 
|-id=491 bgcolor=#C2FFFF
| 295491 ||  || — || September 4, 2008 || Kitt Peak || Spacewatch || L4ERY || align=right | 7.8 km || 
|-id=492 bgcolor=#fefefe
| 295492 ||  || — || September 5, 2008 || Andrushivka || Andrushivka Obs. || NYS || align=right data-sort-value="0.88" | 880 m || 
|-id=493 bgcolor=#fefefe
| 295493 ||  || — || September 4, 2008 || Socorro || LINEAR || — || align=right | 1.2 km || 
|-id=494 bgcolor=#d6d6d6
| 295494 ||  || — || September 2, 2008 || Kitt Peak || Spacewatch || KOR || align=right | 1.5 km || 
|-id=495 bgcolor=#E9E9E9
| 295495 ||  || — || September 2, 2008 || Kitt Peak || Spacewatch || — || align=right | 2.5 km || 
|-id=496 bgcolor=#E9E9E9
| 295496 ||  || — || September 2, 2008 || Kitt Peak || Spacewatch || — || align=right | 2.9 km || 
|-id=497 bgcolor=#C2FFFF
| 295497 ||  || — || September 2, 2008 || Kitt Peak || Spacewatch || L4 || align=right | 11 km || 
|-id=498 bgcolor=#d6d6d6
| 295498 ||  || — || September 2, 2008 || Kitt Peak || Spacewatch || — || align=right | 3.1 km || 
|-id=499 bgcolor=#fefefe
| 295499 ||  || — || September 2, 2008 || Kitt Peak || Spacewatch || — || align=right data-sort-value="0.62" | 620 m || 
|-id=500 bgcolor=#C2FFFF
| 295500 ||  || — || September 2, 2008 || Kitt Peak || Spacewatch || L4ERY || align=right | 7.7 km || 
|}

295501–295600 

|-bgcolor=#fefefe
| 295501 ||  || — || September 3, 2008 || Kitt Peak || Spacewatch || — || align=right | 1.0 km || 
|-id=502 bgcolor=#C2FFFF
| 295502 ||  || — || September 3, 2008 || Kitt Peak || Spacewatch || L4 || align=right | 9.2 km || 
|-id=503 bgcolor=#C2FFFF
| 295503 ||  || — || September 3, 2008 || Kitt Peak || Spacewatch || L4ERY || align=right | 8.7 km || 
|-id=504 bgcolor=#C2FFFF
| 295504 ||  || — || September 3, 2008 || Kitt Peak || Spacewatch || L4 || align=right | 12 km || 
|-id=505 bgcolor=#d6d6d6
| 295505 ||  || — || September 4, 2008 || Kitt Peak || Spacewatch || — || align=right | 4.2 km || 
|-id=506 bgcolor=#fefefe
| 295506 ||  || — || September 4, 2008 || Kitt Peak || Spacewatch || — || align=right data-sort-value="0.76" | 760 m || 
|-id=507 bgcolor=#d6d6d6
| 295507 ||  || — || September 4, 2008 || Kitt Peak || Spacewatch || — || align=right | 3.3 km || 
|-id=508 bgcolor=#fefefe
| 295508 ||  || — || September 4, 2008 || Kitt Peak || Spacewatch || NYS || align=right data-sort-value="0.84" | 840 m || 
|-id=509 bgcolor=#C2FFFF
| 295509 ||  || — || September 6, 2008 || Catalina || CSS || L4 || align=right | 10 km || 
|-id=510 bgcolor=#fefefe
| 295510 ||  || — || September 6, 2008 || Catalina || CSS || — || align=right data-sort-value="0.74" | 740 m || 
|-id=511 bgcolor=#fefefe
| 295511 ||  || — || September 6, 2008 || Catalina || CSS || CIM || align=right | 4.0 km || 
|-id=512 bgcolor=#fefefe
| 295512 ||  || — || September 6, 2008 || Mount Lemmon || Mount Lemmon Survey || — || align=right data-sort-value="0.96" | 960 m || 
|-id=513 bgcolor=#C2FFFF
| 295513 ||  || — || September 4, 2008 || Kitt Peak || Spacewatch || L4ERY || align=right | 7.6 km || 
|-id=514 bgcolor=#d6d6d6
| 295514 ||  || — || September 5, 2008 || Kitt Peak || Spacewatch || EOS || align=right | 2.7 km || 
|-id=515 bgcolor=#d6d6d6
| 295515 ||  || — || September 5, 2008 || Kitt Peak || Spacewatch || — || align=right | 4.2 km || 
|-id=516 bgcolor=#E9E9E9
| 295516 ||  || — || September 6, 2008 || Kitt Peak || Spacewatch || — || align=right | 1.6 km || 
|-id=517 bgcolor=#E9E9E9
| 295517 ||  || — || September 4, 2008 || Kitt Peak || Spacewatch || — || align=right data-sort-value="0.95" | 950 m || 
|-id=518 bgcolor=#fefefe
| 295518 ||  || — || September 5, 2008 || Kitt Peak || Spacewatch || — || align=right | 1.2 km || 
|-id=519 bgcolor=#d6d6d6
| 295519 ||  || — || September 2, 2008 || Kitt Peak || Spacewatch || HYG || align=right | 3.3 km || 
|-id=520 bgcolor=#C2FFFF
| 295520 ||  || — || September 5, 2008 || Kitt Peak || Spacewatch || L4ERY || align=right | 11 km || 
|-id=521 bgcolor=#E9E9E9
| 295521 ||  || — || September 6, 2008 || Kitt Peak || Spacewatch || — || align=right | 2.1 km || 
|-id=522 bgcolor=#E9E9E9
| 295522 ||  || — || September 7, 2008 || Mount Lemmon || Mount Lemmon Survey || — || align=right | 2.5 km || 
|-id=523 bgcolor=#E9E9E9
| 295523 ||  || — || September 7, 2008 || Mount Lemmon || Mount Lemmon Survey || — || align=right data-sort-value="0.99" | 990 m || 
|-id=524 bgcolor=#d6d6d6
| 295524 ||  || — || September 7, 2008 || Mount Lemmon || Mount Lemmon Survey || HYG || align=right | 3.0 km || 
|-id=525 bgcolor=#d6d6d6
| 295525 ||  || — || September 9, 2008 || Mount Lemmon || Mount Lemmon Survey || — || align=right | 3.9 km || 
|-id=526 bgcolor=#E9E9E9
| 295526 ||  || — || September 9, 2008 || Mount Lemmon || Mount Lemmon Survey || — || align=right | 1.5 km || 
|-id=527 bgcolor=#C2FFFF
| 295527 ||  || — || September 4, 2008 || Kitt Peak || Spacewatch || L4 || align=right | 12 km || 
|-id=528 bgcolor=#C2FFFF
| 295528 ||  || — || September 6, 2008 || Kitt Peak || Spacewatch || L4 || align=right | 8.6 km || 
|-id=529 bgcolor=#C2FFFF
| 295529 ||  || — || September 2, 2008 || Kitt Peak || Spacewatch || L4 || align=right | 11 km || 
|-id=530 bgcolor=#C2FFFF
| 295530 ||  || — || September 6, 2008 || Mount Lemmon || Mount Lemmon Survey || L4 || align=right | 8.4 km || 
|-id=531 bgcolor=#C2FFFF
| 295531 ||  || — || September 7, 2008 || Mount Lemmon || Mount Lemmon Survey || L4 || align=right | 11 km || 
|-id=532 bgcolor=#d6d6d6
| 295532 ||  || — || September 6, 2008 || Mount Lemmon || Mount Lemmon Survey || — || align=right | 2.6 km || 
|-id=533 bgcolor=#fefefe
| 295533 ||  || — || September 7, 2008 || Catalina || CSS || NYS || align=right data-sort-value="0.88" | 880 m || 
|-id=534 bgcolor=#d6d6d6
| 295534 ||  || — || September 6, 2008 || Catalina || CSS || — || align=right | 5.4 km || 
|-id=535 bgcolor=#fefefe
| 295535 ||  || — || September 6, 2008 || Catalina || CSS || SUL || align=right | 2.5 km || 
|-id=536 bgcolor=#d6d6d6
| 295536 ||  || — || September 6, 2008 || Mount Lemmon || Mount Lemmon Survey || — || align=right | 4.2 km || 
|-id=537 bgcolor=#d6d6d6
| 295537 ||  || — || September 6, 2008 || Catalina || CSS || ALA || align=right | 5.4 km || 
|-id=538 bgcolor=#E9E9E9
| 295538 ||  || — || September 6, 2008 || Mount Lemmon || Mount Lemmon Survey || WIT || align=right | 1.2 km || 
|-id=539 bgcolor=#d6d6d6
| 295539 ||  || — || September 7, 2008 || Socorro || LINEAR || — || align=right | 5.1 km || 
|-id=540 bgcolor=#E9E9E9
| 295540 ||  || — || September 7, 2008 || Socorro || LINEAR || — || align=right | 4.2 km || 
|-id=541 bgcolor=#d6d6d6
| 295541 ||  || — || September 22, 2008 || Sierra Stars || F. Tozzi || MEL || align=right | 4.0 km || 
|-id=542 bgcolor=#d6d6d6
| 295542 ||  || — || September 22, 2008 || Hibiscus || N. Teamo || CHA || align=right | 3.0 km || 
|-id=543 bgcolor=#fefefe
| 295543 ||  || — || September 22, 2008 || Socorro || LINEAR || MAS || align=right data-sort-value="0.84" | 840 m || 
|-id=544 bgcolor=#fefefe
| 295544 ||  || — || September 22, 2008 || Goodricke-Pigott || R. A. Tucker || — || align=right | 1.1 km || 
|-id=545 bgcolor=#fefefe
| 295545 ||  || — || September 22, 2008 || Socorro || LINEAR || — || align=right | 1.0 km || 
|-id=546 bgcolor=#E9E9E9
| 295546 ||  || — || September 23, 2008 || Socorro || LINEAR || EUN || align=right | 1.6 km || 
|-id=547 bgcolor=#E9E9E9
| 295547 ||  || — || September 19, 2008 || Kitt Peak || Spacewatch || WIT || align=right | 1.3 km || 
|-id=548 bgcolor=#fefefe
| 295548 ||  || — || September 19, 2008 || Kitt Peak || Spacewatch || — || align=right data-sort-value="0.93" | 930 m || 
|-id=549 bgcolor=#fefefe
| 295549 ||  || — || September 19, 2008 || Kitt Peak || Spacewatch || — || align=right data-sort-value="0.69" | 690 m || 
|-id=550 bgcolor=#d6d6d6
| 295550 ||  || — || September 19, 2008 || Kitt Peak || Spacewatch || — || align=right | 3.0 km || 
|-id=551 bgcolor=#fefefe
| 295551 ||  || — || September 19, 2008 || Kitt Peak || Spacewatch || NYS || align=right data-sort-value="0.81" | 810 m || 
|-id=552 bgcolor=#fefefe
| 295552 ||  || — || September 20, 2008 || Mount Lemmon || Mount Lemmon Survey || — || align=right data-sort-value="0.98" | 980 m || 
|-id=553 bgcolor=#C2FFFF
| 295553 ||  || — || September 20, 2008 || Kitt Peak || Spacewatch || L4 || align=right | 8.5 km || 
|-id=554 bgcolor=#E9E9E9
| 295554 ||  || — || September 20, 2008 || Kitt Peak || Spacewatch || — || align=right | 3.1 km || 
|-id=555 bgcolor=#d6d6d6
| 295555 ||  || — || September 20, 2008 || Mount Lemmon || Mount Lemmon Survey || — || align=right | 2.9 km || 
|-id=556 bgcolor=#fefefe
| 295556 ||  || — || September 20, 2008 || Mount Lemmon || Mount Lemmon Survey || — || align=right data-sort-value="0.75" | 750 m || 
|-id=557 bgcolor=#d6d6d6
| 295557 ||  || — || September 20, 2008 || Mount Lemmon || Mount Lemmon Survey || THM || align=right | 3.2 km || 
|-id=558 bgcolor=#C2FFFF
| 295558 ||  || — || September 20, 2008 || Mount Lemmon || Mount Lemmon Survey || L4 || align=right | 9.4 km || 
|-id=559 bgcolor=#fefefe
| 295559 ||  || — || September 20, 2008 || Kitt Peak || Spacewatch || — || align=right data-sort-value="0.66" | 660 m || 
|-id=560 bgcolor=#d6d6d6
| 295560 ||  || — || September 21, 2008 || Kitt Peak || Spacewatch || — || align=right | 2.9 km || 
|-id=561 bgcolor=#d6d6d6
| 295561 ||  || — || September 21, 2008 || Mount Lemmon || Mount Lemmon Survey || EOS || align=right | 2.3 km || 
|-id=562 bgcolor=#d6d6d6
| 295562 ||  || — || September 21, 2008 || Catalina || CSS || HIL3:2 || align=right | 6.5 km || 
|-id=563 bgcolor=#E9E9E9
| 295563 ||  || — || September 21, 2008 || Mount Lemmon || Mount Lemmon Survey || — || align=right | 3.5 km || 
|-id=564 bgcolor=#fefefe
| 295564 ||  || — || September 22, 2008 || Mount Lemmon || Mount Lemmon Survey || — || align=right data-sort-value="0.98" | 980 m || 
|-id=565 bgcolor=#E9E9E9
| 295565 Hannover ||  ||  || September 27, 2008 || Taunus || S. Karge, E. Schwab || — || align=right | 1.4 km || 
|-id=566 bgcolor=#fefefe
| 295566 ||  || — || September 28, 2008 || Altschwendt || W. Ries || — || align=right | 1.1 km || 
|-id=567 bgcolor=#fefefe
| 295567 ||  || — || September 20, 2008 || Kitt Peak || Spacewatch || — || align=right | 1.1 km || 
|-id=568 bgcolor=#d6d6d6
| 295568 ||  || — || September 21, 2008 || Kitt Peak || Spacewatch || EOS || align=right | 2.8 km || 
|-id=569 bgcolor=#E9E9E9
| 295569 ||  || — || September 21, 2008 || Kitt Peak || Spacewatch || VIB || align=right | 2.1 km || 
|-id=570 bgcolor=#E9E9E9
| 295570 ||  || — || September 21, 2008 || Kitt Peak || Spacewatch || — || align=right | 2.1 km || 
|-id=571 bgcolor=#E9E9E9
| 295571 ||  || — || September 21, 2008 || Kitt Peak || Spacewatch || — || align=right | 1.9 km || 
|-id=572 bgcolor=#E9E9E9
| 295572 ||  || — || September 21, 2008 || Kitt Peak || Spacewatch || — || align=right | 1.0 km || 
|-id=573 bgcolor=#fefefe
| 295573 ||  || — || September 21, 2008 || Mount Lemmon || Mount Lemmon Survey || FLO || align=right data-sort-value="0.69" | 690 m || 
|-id=574 bgcolor=#fefefe
| 295574 ||  || — || September 21, 2008 || Kitt Peak || Spacewatch || — || align=right | 1.2 km || 
|-id=575 bgcolor=#E9E9E9
| 295575 ||  || — || September 21, 2008 || Kitt Peak || Spacewatch || NEM || align=right | 2.8 km || 
|-id=576 bgcolor=#E9E9E9
| 295576 ||  || — || September 21, 2008 || Kitt Peak || Spacewatch || AGN || align=right | 1.5 km || 
|-id=577 bgcolor=#d6d6d6
| 295577 ||  || — || September 22, 2008 || Kitt Peak || Spacewatch || — || align=right | 3.1 km || 
|-id=578 bgcolor=#C2FFFF
| 295578 ||  || — || September 22, 2008 || Mount Lemmon || Mount Lemmon Survey || L4 || align=right | 10 km || 
|-id=579 bgcolor=#E9E9E9
| 295579 ||  || — || September 22, 2008 || Kitt Peak || Spacewatch || — || align=right | 1.5 km || 
|-id=580 bgcolor=#fefefe
| 295580 ||  || — || September 22, 2008 || Kitt Peak || Spacewatch || — || align=right | 1.1 km || 
|-id=581 bgcolor=#d6d6d6
| 295581 ||  || — || September 22, 2008 || Kitt Peak || Spacewatch || — || align=right | 3.5 km || 
|-id=582 bgcolor=#d6d6d6
| 295582 ||  || — || September 22, 2008 || Kitt Peak || Spacewatch || — || align=right | 6.4 km || 
|-id=583 bgcolor=#fefefe
| 295583 ||  || — || September 22, 2008 || Mount Lemmon || Mount Lemmon Survey || — || align=right data-sort-value="0.58" | 580 m || 
|-id=584 bgcolor=#E9E9E9
| 295584 ||  || — || September 22, 2008 || Mount Lemmon || Mount Lemmon Survey || — || align=right | 1.8 km || 
|-id=585 bgcolor=#fefefe
| 295585 ||  || — || September 22, 2008 || Mount Lemmon || Mount Lemmon Survey || — || align=right data-sort-value="0.80" | 800 m || 
|-id=586 bgcolor=#E9E9E9
| 295586 ||  || — || September 22, 2008 || Kitt Peak || Spacewatch || GER || align=right | 1.7 km || 
|-id=587 bgcolor=#E9E9E9
| 295587 ||  || — || September 22, 2008 || Kitt Peak || Spacewatch || — || align=right | 2.6 km || 
|-id=588 bgcolor=#E9E9E9
| 295588 ||  || — || September 22, 2008 || Kitt Peak || Spacewatch || AGN || align=right | 1.2 km || 
|-id=589 bgcolor=#fefefe
| 295589 ||  || — || September 22, 2008 || Kitt Peak || Spacewatch || — || align=right data-sort-value="0.75" | 750 m || 
|-id=590 bgcolor=#E9E9E9
| 295590 ||  || — || September 23, 2008 || Kitt Peak || Spacewatch || — || align=right | 1.4 km || 
|-id=591 bgcolor=#C2FFFF
| 295591 ||  || — || September 23, 2008 || Mount Lemmon || Mount Lemmon Survey || L4 || align=right | 9.9 km || 
|-id=592 bgcolor=#fefefe
| 295592 ||  || — || September 23, 2008 || Kitt Peak || Spacewatch || V || align=right data-sort-value="0.89" | 890 m || 
|-id=593 bgcolor=#fefefe
| 295593 ||  || — || September 23, 2008 || Kitt Peak || Spacewatch || — || align=right data-sort-value="0.85" | 850 m || 
|-id=594 bgcolor=#E9E9E9
| 295594 ||  || — || September 20, 2008 || Kitt Peak || Spacewatch || — || align=right | 2.4 km || 
|-id=595 bgcolor=#fefefe
| 295595 ||  || — || September 23, 2008 || Kitt Peak || Spacewatch || V || align=right data-sort-value="0.74" | 740 m || 
|-id=596 bgcolor=#d6d6d6
| 295596 ||  || — || September 23, 2008 || Kitt Peak || Spacewatch || EOS || align=right | 4.8 km || 
|-id=597 bgcolor=#d6d6d6
| 295597 ||  || — || September 28, 2008 || Socorro || LINEAR || THM || align=right | 2.8 km || 
|-id=598 bgcolor=#fefefe
| 295598 ||  || — || September 28, 2008 || Socorro || LINEAR || FLO || align=right data-sort-value="0.58" | 580 m || 
|-id=599 bgcolor=#C2FFFF
| 295599 ||  || — || September 21, 2008 || Mount Lemmon || Mount Lemmon Survey || L4ARK || align=right | 8.5 km || 
|-id=600 bgcolor=#fefefe
| 295600 ||  || — || September 22, 2008 || Kitt Peak || Spacewatch || FLO || align=right data-sort-value="0.70" | 700 m || 
|}

295601–295700 

|-bgcolor=#d6d6d6
| 295601 ||  || — || September 23, 2008 || Kitt Peak || Spacewatch || — || align=right | 3.0 km || 
|-id=602 bgcolor=#fefefe
| 295602 ||  || — || September 23, 2008 || Mount Lemmon || Mount Lemmon Survey || — || align=right data-sort-value="0.71" | 710 m || 
|-id=603 bgcolor=#fefefe
| 295603 ||  || — || September 23, 2008 || Mount Lemmon || Mount Lemmon Survey || FLO || align=right data-sort-value="0.68" | 680 m || 
|-id=604 bgcolor=#E9E9E9
| 295604 ||  || — || September 23, 2008 || Kitt Peak || Spacewatch || AGN || align=right | 1.5 km || 
|-id=605 bgcolor=#fefefe
| 295605 ||  || — || September 24, 2008 || Kitt Peak || Spacewatch || — || align=right data-sort-value="0.86" | 860 m || 
|-id=606 bgcolor=#fefefe
| 295606 ||  || — || March 11, 2007 || Kitt Peak || Spacewatch || FLO || align=right data-sort-value="0.68" | 680 m || 
|-id=607 bgcolor=#E9E9E9
| 295607 ||  || — || September 24, 2008 || Kitt Peak || Spacewatch || — || align=right | 2.1 km || 
|-id=608 bgcolor=#fefefe
| 295608 ||  || — || September 25, 2008 || Kitt Peak || Spacewatch || V || align=right data-sort-value="0.80" | 800 m || 
|-id=609 bgcolor=#fefefe
| 295609 ||  || — || September 25, 2008 || Kitt Peak || Spacewatch || — || align=right | 1.2 km || 
|-id=610 bgcolor=#fefefe
| 295610 ||  || — || September 25, 2008 || Kitt Peak || Spacewatch || FLO || align=right data-sort-value="0.70" | 700 m || 
|-id=611 bgcolor=#E9E9E9
| 295611 ||  || — || September 25, 2008 || Kitt Peak || Spacewatch || — || align=right | 1.4 km || 
|-id=612 bgcolor=#E9E9E9
| 295612 ||  || — || September 25, 2008 || Kitt Peak || Spacewatch || EUN || align=right | 1.4 km || 
|-id=613 bgcolor=#d6d6d6
| 295613 ||  || — || September 25, 2008 || Kitt Peak || Spacewatch || — || align=right | 3.2 km || 
|-id=614 bgcolor=#fefefe
| 295614 ||  || — || September 25, 2008 || Kitt Peak || Spacewatch || FLO || align=right data-sort-value="0.88" | 880 m || 
|-id=615 bgcolor=#fefefe
| 295615 ||  || — || September 26, 2008 || Kitt Peak || Spacewatch || — || align=right | 1.9 km || 
|-id=616 bgcolor=#d6d6d6
| 295616 ||  || — || September 26, 2008 || Kitt Peak || Spacewatch || — || align=right | 4.6 km || 
|-id=617 bgcolor=#E9E9E9
| 295617 ||  || — || September 27, 2008 || Catalina || CSS || JUN || align=right | 1.8 km || 
|-id=618 bgcolor=#C2FFFF
| 295618 ||  || — || September 29, 2008 || Mount Lemmon || Mount Lemmon Survey || L4 || align=right | 8.9 km || 
|-id=619 bgcolor=#E9E9E9
| 295619 ||  || — || September 30, 2008 || La Sagra || OAM Obs. || — || align=right | 1.8 km || 
|-id=620 bgcolor=#fefefe
| 295620 ||  || — || September 25, 2008 || Mount Lemmon || Mount Lemmon Survey || FLO || align=right data-sort-value="0.52" | 520 m || 
|-id=621 bgcolor=#C2FFFF
| 295621 ||  || — || September 25, 2008 || Mount Lemmon || Mount Lemmon Survey || L4 || align=right | 8.5 km || 
|-id=622 bgcolor=#fefefe
| 295622 ||  || — || September 26, 2008 || Kitt Peak || Spacewatch || FLO || align=right data-sort-value="0.60" | 600 m || 
|-id=623 bgcolor=#d6d6d6
| 295623 ||  || — || September 26, 2008 || Kitt Peak || Spacewatch || — || align=right | 3.4 km || 
|-id=624 bgcolor=#E9E9E9
| 295624 ||  || — || September 26, 2008 || Kitt Peak || Spacewatch || — || align=right | 1.3 km || 
|-id=625 bgcolor=#C2FFFF
| 295625 ||  || — || September 28, 2008 || Mount Lemmon || Mount Lemmon Survey || L4ERY || align=right | 10 km || 
|-id=626 bgcolor=#E9E9E9
| 295626 ||  || — || September 28, 2008 || Kitt Peak || Spacewatch || KAZ || align=right | 2.2 km || 
|-id=627 bgcolor=#C2FFFF
| 295627 ||  || — || September 29, 2008 || Kitt Peak || Spacewatch || L4 || align=right | 12 km || 
|-id=628 bgcolor=#d6d6d6
| 295628 ||  || — || September 29, 2008 || Kitt Peak || Spacewatch || ELF || align=right | 5.6 km || 
|-id=629 bgcolor=#fefefe
| 295629 ||  || — || September 29, 2008 || Kitt Peak || Spacewatch || — || align=right data-sort-value="0.87" | 870 m || 
|-id=630 bgcolor=#C2FFFF
| 295630 ||  || — || September 29, 2008 || Catalina || CSS || L4 || align=right | 11 km || 
|-id=631 bgcolor=#E9E9E9
| 295631 ||  || — || September 21, 2008 || Kitt Peak || Spacewatch || — || align=right | 1.6 km || 
|-id=632 bgcolor=#d6d6d6
| 295632 ||  || — || September 23, 2008 || Kitt Peak || Spacewatch || — || align=right | 5.8 km || 
|-id=633 bgcolor=#E9E9E9
| 295633 ||  || — || September 25, 2008 || Kitt Peak || Spacewatch || — || align=right data-sort-value="0.97" | 970 m || 
|-id=634 bgcolor=#C2FFFF
| 295634 ||  || — || September 21, 2008 || Catalina || CSS || L4 || align=right | 14 km || 
|-id=635 bgcolor=#E9E9E9
| 295635 ||  || — || September 21, 2008 || Kitt Peak || Spacewatch || — || align=right | 1.1 km || 
|-id=636 bgcolor=#fefefe
| 295636 ||  || — || September 21, 2008 || Kitt Peak || Spacewatch || KLI || align=right | 2.6 km || 
|-id=637 bgcolor=#fefefe
| 295637 ||  || — || September 22, 2008 || Kitt Peak || Spacewatch || NYS || align=right | 2.1 km || 
|-id=638 bgcolor=#fefefe
| 295638 ||  || — || September 22, 2008 || Mount Lemmon || Mount Lemmon Survey || — || align=right data-sort-value="0.71" | 710 m || 
|-id=639 bgcolor=#E9E9E9
| 295639 ||  || — || September 20, 2008 || Kitt Peak || Spacewatch || AST || align=right | 2.9 km || 
|-id=640 bgcolor=#d6d6d6
| 295640 ||  || — || September 22, 2008 || Mount Lemmon || Mount Lemmon Survey || — || align=right | 2.7 km || 
|-id=641 bgcolor=#fefefe
| 295641 ||  || — || September 23, 2008 || Kitt Peak || Spacewatch || — || align=right data-sort-value="0.88" | 880 m || 
|-id=642 bgcolor=#fefefe
| 295642 ||  || — || September 26, 2008 || Kitt Peak || Spacewatch || — || align=right | 1.4 km || 
|-id=643 bgcolor=#E9E9E9
| 295643 ||  || — || September 28, 2008 || Kitt Peak || Spacewatch || — || align=right | 2.1 km || 
|-id=644 bgcolor=#C2FFFF
| 295644 ||  || — || September 29, 2008 || Mount Lemmon || Mount Lemmon Survey || L4 || align=right | 9.5 km || 
|-id=645 bgcolor=#C2FFFF
| 295645 ||  || — || September 24, 2008 || Kitt Peak || Spacewatch || L4 || align=right | 8.9 km || 
|-id=646 bgcolor=#fefefe
| 295646 ||  || — || September 29, 2008 || Kitt Peak || Spacewatch || — || align=right | 1.2 km || 
|-id=647 bgcolor=#E9E9E9
| 295647 ||  || — || September 22, 2008 || Catalina || CSS || AER || align=right | 1.9 km || 
|-id=648 bgcolor=#E9E9E9
| 295648 ||  || — || September 28, 2008 || Mount Lemmon || Mount Lemmon Survey || — || align=right | 2.2 km || 
|-id=649 bgcolor=#d6d6d6
| 295649 ||  || — || September 23, 2008 || Socorro || LINEAR || — || align=right | 3.7 km || 
|-id=650 bgcolor=#FA8072
| 295650 ||  || — || September 26, 2008 || Kitt Peak || Spacewatch || — || align=right data-sort-value="0.80" | 800 m || 
|-id=651 bgcolor=#d6d6d6
| 295651 ||  || — || September 29, 2008 || Mount Lemmon || Mount Lemmon Survey || — || align=right | 3.2 km || 
|-id=652 bgcolor=#E9E9E9
| 295652 ||  || — || October 1, 2008 || Hibiscus || S. F. Hönig, N. Teamo || — || align=right | 2.6 km || 
|-id=653 bgcolor=#C2FFFF
| 295653 ||  || — || October 1, 2008 || La Sagra || OAM Obs. || L4ERY || align=right | 11 km || 
|-id=654 bgcolor=#E9E9E9
| 295654 ||  || — || October 3, 2008 || La Sagra || OAM Obs. || — || align=right | 2.3 km || 
|-id=655 bgcolor=#fefefe
| 295655 ||  || — || October 3, 2008 || La Sagra || OAM Obs. || V || align=right data-sort-value="0.95" | 950 m || 
|-id=656 bgcolor=#d6d6d6
| 295656 ||  || — || October 4, 2008 || La Sagra || OAM Obs. || — || align=right | 6.7 km || 
|-id=657 bgcolor=#E9E9E9
| 295657 ||  || — || October 1, 2008 || Mount Lemmon || Mount Lemmon Survey || MAR || align=right | 1.2 km || 
|-id=658 bgcolor=#fefefe
| 295658 ||  || — || October 1, 2008 || Mount Lemmon || Mount Lemmon Survey || — || align=right | 1.1 km || 
|-id=659 bgcolor=#fefefe
| 295659 ||  || — || October 1, 2008 || Kitt Peak || Spacewatch || — || align=right data-sort-value="0.75" | 750 m || 
|-id=660 bgcolor=#d6d6d6
| 295660 ||  || — || October 1, 2008 || Mount Lemmon || Mount Lemmon Survey || — || align=right | 3.2 km || 
|-id=661 bgcolor=#E9E9E9
| 295661 ||  || — || October 1, 2008 || Mount Lemmon || Mount Lemmon Survey || — || align=right | 1.8 km || 
|-id=662 bgcolor=#fefefe
| 295662 ||  || — || October 1, 2008 || Mount Lemmon || Mount Lemmon Survey || — || align=right | 1.6 km || 
|-id=663 bgcolor=#fefefe
| 295663 ||  || — || October 1, 2008 || Kitt Peak || Spacewatch || NYS || align=right data-sort-value="0.96" | 960 m || 
|-id=664 bgcolor=#d6d6d6
| 295664 ||  || — || October 2, 2008 || Kitt Peak || Spacewatch || KOR || align=right | 1.4 km || 
|-id=665 bgcolor=#fefefe
| 295665 ||  || — || October 2, 2008 || Kitt Peak || Spacewatch || — || align=right | 1.2 km || 
|-id=666 bgcolor=#d6d6d6
| 295666 ||  || — || October 2, 2008 || Kitt Peak || Spacewatch || — || align=right | 2.5 km || 
|-id=667 bgcolor=#d6d6d6
| 295667 ||  || — || October 2, 2008 || Mount Lemmon || Mount Lemmon Survey || — || align=right | 3.3 km || 
|-id=668 bgcolor=#d6d6d6
| 295668 ||  || — || October 2, 2008 || Kitt Peak || Spacewatch || — || align=right | 2.5 km || 
|-id=669 bgcolor=#fefefe
| 295669 ||  || — || October 2, 2008 || Kitt Peak || Spacewatch || — || align=right data-sort-value="0.67" | 670 m || 
|-id=670 bgcolor=#E9E9E9
| 295670 ||  || — || October 2, 2008 || Mount Lemmon || Mount Lemmon Survey || — || align=right | 1.8 km || 
|-id=671 bgcolor=#d6d6d6
| 295671 ||  || — || October 2, 2008 || Mount Lemmon || Mount Lemmon Survey || — || align=right | 2.9 km || 
|-id=672 bgcolor=#E9E9E9
| 295672 ||  || — || October 3, 2008 || La Sagra || OAM Obs. || — || align=right | 2.9 km || 
|-id=673 bgcolor=#fefefe
| 295673 ||  || — || October 3, 2008 || Mount Lemmon || Mount Lemmon Survey || — || align=right data-sort-value="0.85" | 850 m || 
|-id=674 bgcolor=#fefefe
| 295674 ||  || — || October 3, 2008 || Kitt Peak || Spacewatch || — || align=right data-sort-value="0.76" | 760 m || 
|-id=675 bgcolor=#C2FFFF
| 295675 ||  || — || October 3, 2008 || La Sagra || OAM Obs. || L4 || align=right | 10 km || 
|-id=676 bgcolor=#C2FFFF
| 295676 ||  || — || October 4, 2008 || La Sagra || OAM Obs. || L4 || align=right | 9.4 km || 
|-id=677 bgcolor=#fefefe
| 295677 ||  || — || October 5, 2008 || La Sagra || OAM Obs. || — || align=right | 1.1 km || 
|-id=678 bgcolor=#fefefe
| 295678 ||  || — || October 5, 2008 || La Sagra || OAM Obs. || — || align=right | 1.1 km || 
|-id=679 bgcolor=#d6d6d6
| 295679 ||  || — || October 6, 2008 || Kitt Peak || Spacewatch || THM || align=right | 2.6 km || 
|-id=680 bgcolor=#fefefe
| 295680 ||  || — || October 6, 2008 || Kitt Peak || Spacewatch || MAS || align=right data-sort-value="0.67" | 670 m || 
|-id=681 bgcolor=#C2FFFF
| 295681 ||  || — || October 6, 2008 || Kitt Peak || Spacewatch || L4 || align=right | 8.8 km || 
|-id=682 bgcolor=#d6d6d6
| 295682 ||  || — || October 6, 2008 || Catalina || CSS || — || align=right | 3.2 km || 
|-id=683 bgcolor=#E9E9E9
| 295683 ||  || — || October 6, 2008 || Catalina || CSS || MRX || align=right | 1.4 km || 
|-id=684 bgcolor=#fefefe
| 295684 ||  || — || October 6, 2008 || Catalina || CSS || — || align=right | 1.1 km || 
|-id=685 bgcolor=#E9E9E9
| 295685 ||  || — || October 7, 2008 || Kitt Peak || Spacewatch || HEN || align=right | 1.2 km || 
|-id=686 bgcolor=#C2FFFF
| 295686 ||  || — || October 7, 2008 || Kitt Peak || Spacewatch || L4 || align=right | 13 km || 
|-id=687 bgcolor=#fefefe
| 295687 ||  || — || October 8, 2008 || Kitt Peak || Spacewatch || — || align=right data-sort-value="0.75" | 750 m || 
|-id=688 bgcolor=#d6d6d6
| 295688 ||  || — || October 8, 2008 || Catalina || CSS || THM || align=right | 2.5 km || 
|-id=689 bgcolor=#d6d6d6
| 295689 ||  || — || October 8, 2008 || Kitt Peak || Spacewatch || KOR || align=right | 1.5 km || 
|-id=690 bgcolor=#fefefe
| 295690 ||  || — || October 8, 2008 || Mount Lemmon || Mount Lemmon Survey || — || align=right data-sort-value="0.80" | 800 m || 
|-id=691 bgcolor=#fefefe
| 295691 ||  || — || October 9, 2008 || Mount Lemmon || Mount Lemmon Survey || — || align=right | 1.1 km || 
|-id=692 bgcolor=#d6d6d6
| 295692 ||  || — || October 9, 2008 || Mount Lemmon || Mount Lemmon Survey || THM || align=right | 2.2 km || 
|-id=693 bgcolor=#d6d6d6
| 295693 ||  || — || October 8, 2008 || Siding Spring || SSS || — || align=right | 4.1 km || 
|-id=694 bgcolor=#fefefe
| 295694 ||  || — || October 8, 2008 || Kitt Peak || Spacewatch || — || align=right data-sort-value="0.80" | 800 m || 
|-id=695 bgcolor=#fefefe
| 295695 ||  || — || October 6, 2008 || Mount Lemmon || Mount Lemmon Survey || — || align=right data-sort-value="0.86" | 860 m || 
|-id=696 bgcolor=#E9E9E9
| 295696 ||  || — || October 10, 2008 || Kitt Peak || Spacewatch || MAR || align=right | 1.2 km || 
|-id=697 bgcolor=#d6d6d6
| 295697 ||  || — || October 6, 2008 || Kitt Peak || Spacewatch || EOS || align=right | 2.6 km || 
|-id=698 bgcolor=#d6d6d6
| 295698 ||  || — || October 3, 2008 || Mount Lemmon || Mount Lemmon Survey || KOR || align=right | 1.9 km || 
|-id=699 bgcolor=#C2FFFF
| 295699 ||  || — || October 1, 2008 || Mount Lemmon || Mount Lemmon Survey || L4 || align=right | 8.5 km || 
|-id=700 bgcolor=#fefefe
| 295700 ||  || — || October 6, 2008 || Mount Lemmon || Mount Lemmon Survey || — || align=right data-sort-value="0.63" | 630 m || 
|}

295701–295800 

|-bgcolor=#C2FFFF
| 295701 ||  || — || October 8, 2008 || Kitt Peak || Spacewatch || L4ERY || align=right | 16 km || 
|-id=702 bgcolor=#d6d6d6
| 295702 ||  || — || October 2, 2008 || Kitt Peak || Spacewatch || — || align=right | 3.3 km || 
|-id=703 bgcolor=#E9E9E9
| 295703 ||  || — || October 6, 2008 || Mount Lemmon || Mount Lemmon Survey || — || align=right | 1.8 km || 
|-id=704 bgcolor=#E9E9E9
| 295704 ||  || — || October 10, 2008 || Mount Lemmon || Mount Lemmon Survey || — || align=right | 2.0 km || 
|-id=705 bgcolor=#E9E9E9
| 295705 ||  || — || October 1, 2008 || Mount Lemmon || Mount Lemmon Survey || — || align=right | 2.6 km || 
|-id=706 bgcolor=#E9E9E9
| 295706 ||  || — || October 24, 2008 || Mount Lemmon || Mount Lemmon Survey || — || align=right | 2.8 km || 
|-id=707 bgcolor=#E9E9E9
| 295707 ||  || — || October 17, 2008 || Kitt Peak || Spacewatch || — || align=right | 1.5 km || 
|-id=708 bgcolor=#fefefe
| 295708 ||  || — || October 17, 2008 || Kitt Peak || Spacewatch || — || align=right data-sort-value="0.94" | 940 m || 
|-id=709 bgcolor=#fefefe
| 295709 ||  || — || October 17, 2008 || Kitt Peak || Spacewatch || — || align=right data-sort-value="0.84" | 840 m || 
|-id=710 bgcolor=#C2FFFF
| 295710 ||  || — || October 18, 2008 || Kitt Peak || Spacewatch || L4 || align=right | 8.5 km || 
|-id=711 bgcolor=#fefefe
| 295711 ||  || — || October 20, 2008 || Kitt Peak || Spacewatch || MAS || align=right data-sort-value="0.75" | 750 m || 
|-id=712 bgcolor=#fefefe
| 295712 ||  || — || October 20, 2008 || Kitt Peak || Spacewatch || — || align=right | 1.5 km || 
|-id=713 bgcolor=#fefefe
| 295713 ||  || — || October 20, 2008 || Kitt Peak || Spacewatch || FLO || align=right data-sort-value="0.74" | 740 m || 
|-id=714 bgcolor=#d6d6d6
| 295714 ||  || — || October 20, 2008 || Mount Lemmon || Mount Lemmon Survey || — || align=right | 2.5 km || 
|-id=715 bgcolor=#E9E9E9
| 295715 ||  || — || October 20, 2008 || Kitt Peak || Spacewatch || HOF || align=right | 3.3 km || 
|-id=716 bgcolor=#E9E9E9
| 295716 ||  || — || October 20, 2008 || Mount Lemmon || Mount Lemmon Survey || — || align=right | 2.2 km || 
|-id=717 bgcolor=#E9E9E9
| 295717 ||  || — || October 20, 2008 || Kitt Peak || Spacewatch || — || align=right | 2.6 km || 
|-id=718 bgcolor=#fefefe
| 295718 ||  || — || October 20, 2008 || Kitt Peak || Spacewatch || — || align=right data-sort-value="0.81" | 810 m || 
|-id=719 bgcolor=#d6d6d6
| 295719 ||  || — || October 20, 2008 || Kitt Peak || Spacewatch || SHU3:2 || align=right | 4.4 km || 
|-id=720 bgcolor=#d6d6d6
| 295720 ||  || — || October 20, 2008 || Kitt Peak || Spacewatch || 3:2 || align=right | 4.9 km || 
|-id=721 bgcolor=#fefefe
| 295721 ||  || — || October 20, 2008 || Kitt Peak || Spacewatch || — || align=right | 1.2 km || 
|-id=722 bgcolor=#E9E9E9
| 295722 ||  || — || October 20, 2008 || Kitt Peak || Spacewatch || NEM || align=right | 2.5 km || 
|-id=723 bgcolor=#d6d6d6
| 295723 ||  || — || October 20, 2008 || Kitt Peak || Spacewatch || — || align=right | 2.0 km || 
|-id=724 bgcolor=#E9E9E9
| 295724 ||  || — || October 20, 2008 || Mount Lemmon || Mount Lemmon Survey || — || align=right | 2.0 km || 
|-id=725 bgcolor=#E9E9E9
| 295725 ||  || — || October 20, 2008 || Kitt Peak || Spacewatch || — || align=right | 2.5 km || 
|-id=726 bgcolor=#fefefe
| 295726 ||  || — || October 21, 2008 || Kitt Peak || Spacewatch || — || align=right data-sort-value="0.84" | 840 m || 
|-id=727 bgcolor=#fefefe
| 295727 ||  || — || October 21, 2008 || Kitt Peak || Spacewatch || — || align=right data-sort-value="0.91" | 910 m || 
|-id=728 bgcolor=#fefefe
| 295728 ||  || — || October 21, 2008 || Kitt Peak || Spacewatch || — || align=right | 1.0 km || 
|-id=729 bgcolor=#E9E9E9
| 295729 ||  || — || October 21, 2008 || Kitt Peak || Spacewatch || PAD || align=right | 2.3 km || 
|-id=730 bgcolor=#E9E9E9
| 295730 ||  || — || October 21, 2008 || Kitt Peak || Spacewatch || — || align=right | 2.3 km || 
|-id=731 bgcolor=#E9E9E9
| 295731 ||  || — || October 21, 2008 || Kitt Peak || Spacewatch || — || align=right | 2.5 km || 
|-id=732 bgcolor=#d6d6d6
| 295732 ||  || — || October 21, 2008 || Mount Lemmon || Mount Lemmon Survey || — || align=right | 4.1 km || 
|-id=733 bgcolor=#fefefe
| 295733 ||  || — || October 21, 2008 || Kitt Peak || Spacewatch || — || align=right | 1.2 km || 
|-id=734 bgcolor=#E9E9E9
| 295734 ||  || — || October 21, 2008 || Kitt Peak || Spacewatch || — || align=right | 2.2 km || 
|-id=735 bgcolor=#fefefe
| 295735 ||  || — || October 21, 2008 || Kitt Peak || Spacewatch || — || align=right data-sort-value="0.90" | 900 m || 
|-id=736 bgcolor=#E9E9E9
| 295736 ||  || — || October 21, 2008 || Kitt Peak || Spacewatch || — || align=right | 1.3 km || 
|-id=737 bgcolor=#fefefe
| 295737 ||  || — || October 22, 2008 || Kitt Peak || Spacewatch || V || align=right data-sort-value="0.92" | 920 m || 
|-id=738 bgcolor=#E9E9E9
| 295738 ||  || — || October 22, 2008 || Mount Lemmon || Mount Lemmon Survey || — || align=right | 3.4 km || 
|-id=739 bgcolor=#d6d6d6
| 295739 ||  || — || October 23, 2008 || Kitt Peak || Spacewatch || — || align=right | 2.7 km || 
|-id=740 bgcolor=#fefefe
| 295740 ||  || — || October 24, 2008 || Mount Lemmon || Mount Lemmon Survey || — || align=right data-sort-value="0.58" | 580 m || 
|-id=741 bgcolor=#fefefe
| 295741 ||  || — || October 26, 2008 || Socorro || LINEAR || FLO || align=right data-sort-value="0.81" | 810 m || 
|-id=742 bgcolor=#E9E9E9
| 295742 ||  || — || October 25, 2008 || Wildberg || R. Apitzsch || — || align=right | 1.2 km || 
|-id=743 bgcolor=#E9E9E9
| 295743 ||  || — || October 24, 2008 || Socorro || LINEAR || — || align=right | 3.0 km || 
|-id=744 bgcolor=#d6d6d6
| 295744 ||  || — || October 26, 2008 || Socorro || LINEAR || EUP || align=right | 4.7 km || 
|-id=745 bgcolor=#fefefe
| 295745 ||  || — || October 26, 2008 || Socorro || LINEAR || — || align=right data-sort-value="0.88" | 880 m || 
|-id=746 bgcolor=#C2FFFF
| 295746 ||  || — || October 30, 2008 || Cordell-Lorenz || D. T. Durig || L4 || align=right | 17 km || 
|-id=747 bgcolor=#fefefe
| 295747 ||  || — || October 22, 2008 || Kitt Peak || Spacewatch || — || align=right | 1.1 km || 
|-id=748 bgcolor=#E9E9E9
| 295748 ||  || — || October 22, 2008 || Kitt Peak || Spacewatch || — || align=right | 4.1 km || 
|-id=749 bgcolor=#fefefe
| 295749 ||  || — || October 22, 2008 || Kitt Peak || Spacewatch || V || align=right data-sort-value="0.92" | 920 m || 
|-id=750 bgcolor=#d6d6d6
| 295750 ||  || — || October 22, 2008 || Kitt Peak || Spacewatch || — || align=right | 4.4 km || 
|-id=751 bgcolor=#fefefe
| 295751 ||  || — || October 22, 2008 || Kitt Peak || Spacewatch || — || align=right | 1.0 km || 
|-id=752 bgcolor=#fefefe
| 295752 ||  || — || December 30, 2005 || Kitt Peak || Spacewatch || — || align=right | 1.0 km || 
|-id=753 bgcolor=#fefefe
| 295753 ||  || — || October 23, 2008 || Kitt Peak || Spacewatch || — || align=right data-sort-value="0.93" | 930 m || 
|-id=754 bgcolor=#fefefe
| 295754 ||  || — || October 23, 2008 || Kitt Peak || Spacewatch || — || align=right data-sort-value="0.95" | 950 m || 
|-id=755 bgcolor=#fefefe
| 295755 ||  || — || October 23, 2008 || Kitt Peak || Spacewatch || — || align=right data-sort-value="0.76" | 760 m || 
|-id=756 bgcolor=#E9E9E9
| 295756 ||  || — || October 23, 2008 || Kitt Peak || Spacewatch || — || align=right | 1.5 km || 
|-id=757 bgcolor=#E9E9E9
| 295757 ||  || — || October 23, 2008 || Kitt Peak || Spacewatch || — || align=right | 1.6 km || 
|-id=758 bgcolor=#fefefe
| 295758 ||  || — || October 23, 2008 || Kitt Peak || Spacewatch || — || align=right data-sort-value="0.81" | 810 m || 
|-id=759 bgcolor=#d6d6d6
| 295759 ||  || — || October 23, 2008 || Kitt Peak || Spacewatch || — || align=right | 3.3 km || 
|-id=760 bgcolor=#fefefe
| 295760 ||  || — || October 23, 2008 || Mount Lemmon || Mount Lemmon Survey || — || align=right | 1.1 km || 
|-id=761 bgcolor=#fefefe
| 295761 ||  || — || October 23, 2008 || Mount Lemmon || Mount Lemmon Survey || V || align=right data-sort-value="0.89" | 890 m || 
|-id=762 bgcolor=#E9E9E9
| 295762 ||  || — || October 23, 2008 || Kitt Peak || Spacewatch || — || align=right | 1.6 km || 
|-id=763 bgcolor=#fefefe
| 295763 ||  || — || October 23, 2008 || Kitt Peak || Spacewatch || — || align=right data-sort-value="0.83" | 830 m || 
|-id=764 bgcolor=#d6d6d6
| 295764 ||  || — || October 23, 2008 || Kitt Peak || Spacewatch || — || align=right | 3.1 km || 
|-id=765 bgcolor=#E9E9E9
| 295765 ||  || — || October 24, 2008 || Kitt Peak || Spacewatch || — || align=right | 1.9 km || 
|-id=766 bgcolor=#fefefe
| 295766 ||  || — || October 24, 2008 || Kitt Peak || Spacewatch || FLO || align=right data-sort-value="0.86" | 860 m || 
|-id=767 bgcolor=#E9E9E9
| 295767 ||  || — || October 24, 2008 || Catalina || CSS || — || align=right | 2.0 km || 
|-id=768 bgcolor=#E9E9E9
| 295768 ||  || — || October 24, 2008 || Kitt Peak || Spacewatch || — || align=right | 3.4 km || 
|-id=769 bgcolor=#E9E9E9
| 295769 ||  || — || October 24, 2008 || Kitt Peak || Spacewatch || — || align=right | 1.8 km || 
|-id=770 bgcolor=#E9E9E9
| 295770 ||  || — || October 24, 2008 || Mount Lemmon || Mount Lemmon Survey || — || align=right | 2.1 km || 
|-id=771 bgcolor=#fefefe
| 295771 ||  || — || October 24, 2008 || Kitt Peak || Spacewatch || — || align=right | 1.2 km || 
|-id=772 bgcolor=#E9E9E9
| 295772 ||  || — || October 24, 2008 || Kitt Peak || Spacewatch || — || align=right | 1.2 km || 
|-id=773 bgcolor=#E9E9E9
| 295773 ||  || — || October 26, 2008 || Socorro || LINEAR || XIZ || align=right | 1.5 km || 
|-id=774 bgcolor=#fefefe
| 295774 ||  || — || October 27, 2008 || Socorro || LINEAR || NYS || align=right data-sort-value="0.87" | 870 m || 
|-id=775 bgcolor=#fefefe
| 295775 ||  || — || October 28, 2008 || Socorro || LINEAR || — || align=right data-sort-value="0.85" | 850 m || 
|-id=776 bgcolor=#E9E9E9
| 295776 ||  || — || October 28, 2008 || Socorro || LINEAR || — || align=right | 2.4 km || 
|-id=777 bgcolor=#fefefe
| 295777 ||  || — || October 28, 2008 || Socorro || LINEAR || H || align=right data-sort-value="0.73" | 730 m || 
|-id=778 bgcolor=#fefefe
| 295778 ||  || — || October 23, 2008 || Kitt Peak || Spacewatch || — || align=right | 1.0 km || 
|-id=779 bgcolor=#E9E9E9
| 295779 ||  || — || October 23, 2008 || Kitt Peak || Spacewatch || HEN || align=right | 1.0 km || 
|-id=780 bgcolor=#fefefe
| 295780 ||  || — || October 24, 2008 || Catalina || CSS || — || align=right | 1.1 km || 
|-id=781 bgcolor=#E9E9E9
| 295781 ||  || — || October 25, 2008 || Kitt Peak || Spacewatch || — || align=right | 2.7 km || 
|-id=782 bgcolor=#E9E9E9
| 295782 ||  || — || October 25, 2008 || Kitt Peak || Spacewatch || MRX || align=right data-sort-value="0.97" | 970 m || 
|-id=783 bgcolor=#E9E9E9
| 295783 ||  || — || October 25, 2008 || Kitt Peak || Spacewatch || NEM || align=right | 2.5 km || 
|-id=784 bgcolor=#E9E9E9
| 295784 ||  || — || October 25, 2008 || Kitt Peak || Spacewatch || — || align=right | 2.0 km || 
|-id=785 bgcolor=#fefefe
| 295785 ||  || — || October 25, 2008 || Kitt Peak || Spacewatch || V || align=right data-sort-value="0.94" | 940 m || 
|-id=786 bgcolor=#E9E9E9
| 295786 ||  || — || October 25, 2008 || Kitt Peak || Spacewatch || — || align=right | 1.4 km || 
|-id=787 bgcolor=#E9E9E9
| 295787 ||  || — || October 25, 2008 || Kitt Peak || Spacewatch || — || align=right | 2.9 km || 
|-id=788 bgcolor=#fefefe
| 295788 ||  || — || October 26, 2008 || Kitt Peak || Spacewatch || — || align=right data-sort-value="0.76" | 760 m || 
|-id=789 bgcolor=#d6d6d6
| 295789 ||  || — || October 26, 2008 || Kitt Peak || Spacewatch || — || align=right | 4.3 km || 
|-id=790 bgcolor=#fefefe
| 295790 ||  || — || September 6, 2004 || Ottmarsheim || C. Rinner || — || align=right data-sort-value="0.87" | 870 m || 
|-id=791 bgcolor=#d6d6d6
| 295791 ||  || — || October 27, 2008 || Kitt Peak || Spacewatch || — || align=right | 7.0 km || 
|-id=792 bgcolor=#fefefe
| 295792 ||  || — || October 27, 2008 || Kitt Peak || Spacewatch || — || align=right data-sort-value="0.79" | 790 m || 
|-id=793 bgcolor=#fefefe
| 295793 ||  || — || October 28, 2008 || Kitt Peak || Spacewatch || FLO || align=right data-sort-value="0.79" | 790 m || 
|-id=794 bgcolor=#fefefe
| 295794 ||  || — || October 28, 2008 || Kitt Peak || Spacewatch || NYS || align=right data-sort-value="0.81" | 810 m || 
|-id=795 bgcolor=#E9E9E9
| 295795 ||  || — || October 28, 2008 || Kitt Peak || Spacewatch || — || align=right | 2.0 km || 
|-id=796 bgcolor=#fefefe
| 295796 ||  || — || October 28, 2008 || Kitt Peak || Spacewatch || — || align=right data-sort-value="0.73" | 730 m || 
|-id=797 bgcolor=#fefefe
| 295797 ||  || — || October 28, 2008 || Mount Lemmon || Mount Lemmon Survey || — || align=right data-sort-value="0.96" | 960 m || 
|-id=798 bgcolor=#fefefe
| 295798 ||  || — || October 28, 2008 || Mount Lemmon || Mount Lemmon Survey || NYS || align=right data-sort-value="0.76" | 760 m || 
|-id=799 bgcolor=#fefefe
| 295799 ||  || — || October 28, 2008 || Mount Lemmon || Mount Lemmon Survey || — || align=right data-sort-value="0.75" | 750 m || 
|-id=800 bgcolor=#E9E9E9
| 295800 ||  || — || October 28, 2008 || Mount Lemmon || Mount Lemmon Survey || — || align=right | 2.2 km || 
|}

295801–295900 

|-bgcolor=#E9E9E9
| 295801 ||  || — || October 28, 2008 || Kitt Peak || Spacewatch || — || align=right | 2.2 km || 
|-id=802 bgcolor=#fefefe
| 295802 ||  || — || October 29, 2008 || Kitt Peak || Spacewatch || — || align=right data-sort-value="0.81" | 810 m || 
|-id=803 bgcolor=#E9E9E9
| 295803 ||  || — || October 29, 2008 || Kitt Peak || Spacewatch || — || align=right | 4.1 km || 
|-id=804 bgcolor=#fefefe
| 295804 ||  || — || October 29, 2008 || Kitt Peak || Spacewatch || NYS || align=right | 1.1 km || 
|-id=805 bgcolor=#E9E9E9
| 295805 ||  || — || October 30, 2008 || Kitt Peak || Spacewatch || — || align=right | 1.1 km || 
|-id=806 bgcolor=#fefefe
| 295806 ||  || — || October 30, 2008 || Kitt Peak || Spacewatch || — || align=right data-sort-value="0.96" | 960 m || 
|-id=807 bgcolor=#d6d6d6
| 295807 ||  || — || October 30, 2008 || Catalina || CSS || — || align=right | 3.6 km || 
|-id=808 bgcolor=#fefefe
| 295808 ||  || — || October 30, 2008 || Catalina || CSS || V || align=right data-sort-value="0.93" | 930 m || 
|-id=809 bgcolor=#fefefe
| 295809 ||  || — || October 30, 2008 || Mount Lemmon || Mount Lemmon Survey || MAS || align=right data-sort-value="0.87" | 870 m || 
|-id=810 bgcolor=#E9E9E9
| 295810 ||  || — || October 30, 2008 || Kitt Peak || Spacewatch || — || align=right | 2.5 km || 
|-id=811 bgcolor=#fefefe
| 295811 ||  || — || October 31, 2008 || Mount Lemmon || Mount Lemmon Survey || FLO || align=right | 1.6 km || 
|-id=812 bgcolor=#fefefe
| 295812 ||  || — || October 31, 2008 || Mount Lemmon || Mount Lemmon Survey || — || align=right | 2.8 km || 
|-id=813 bgcolor=#E9E9E9
| 295813 ||  || — || October 31, 2008 || Mount Lemmon || Mount Lemmon Survey || — || align=right | 1.6 km || 
|-id=814 bgcolor=#fefefe
| 295814 ||  || — || October 30, 2008 || Mount Lemmon || Mount Lemmon Survey || — || align=right | 1.1 km || 
|-id=815 bgcolor=#d6d6d6
| 295815 ||  || — || October 31, 2008 || Kitt Peak || Spacewatch || — || align=right | 3.6 km || 
|-id=816 bgcolor=#fefefe
| 295816 ||  || — || October 31, 2008 || Mount Lemmon || Mount Lemmon Survey || — || align=right | 2.5 km || 
|-id=817 bgcolor=#fefefe
| 295817 ||  || — || October 20, 2008 || Kitt Peak || Spacewatch || V || align=right data-sort-value="0.77" | 770 m || 
|-id=818 bgcolor=#fefefe
| 295818 ||  || — || October 20, 2008 || Kitt Peak || Spacewatch || — || align=right | 1.0 km || 
|-id=819 bgcolor=#E9E9E9
| 295819 ||  || — || October 20, 2008 || Kitt Peak || Spacewatch || NEM || align=right | 2.3 km || 
|-id=820 bgcolor=#fefefe
| 295820 ||  || — || October 20, 2008 || Kitt Peak || Spacewatch || — || align=right | 1.1 km || 
|-id=821 bgcolor=#fefefe
| 295821 ||  || — || October 21, 2008 || Kitt Peak || Spacewatch || — || align=right data-sort-value="0.97" | 970 m || 
|-id=822 bgcolor=#d6d6d6
| 295822 ||  || — || October 30, 2008 || Catalina || CSS || EUP || align=right | 7.1 km || 
|-id=823 bgcolor=#d6d6d6
| 295823 ||  || — || October 30, 2008 || Kitt Peak || Spacewatch || — || align=right | 3.1 km || 
|-id=824 bgcolor=#E9E9E9
| 295824 ||  || — || October 24, 2008 || Mount Lemmon || Mount Lemmon Survey || PAD || align=right | 3.1 km || 
|-id=825 bgcolor=#fefefe
| 295825 ||  || — || October 26, 2008 || Kitt Peak || Spacewatch || — || align=right data-sort-value="0.86" | 860 m || 
|-id=826 bgcolor=#fefefe
| 295826 ||  || — || October 27, 2008 || Mount Lemmon || Mount Lemmon Survey || MAS || align=right | 1.0 km || 
|-id=827 bgcolor=#E9E9E9
| 295827 ||  || — || October 24, 2008 || Catalina || CSS || — || align=right | 2.3 km || 
|-id=828 bgcolor=#E9E9E9
| 295828 ||  || — || October 20, 2008 || Kitt Peak || Spacewatch || MRX || align=right | 1.2 km || 
|-id=829 bgcolor=#fefefe
| 295829 ||  || — || October 26, 2008 || Mount Lemmon || Mount Lemmon Survey || V || align=right data-sort-value="0.88" | 880 m || 
|-id=830 bgcolor=#fefefe
| 295830 ||  || — || October 21, 2008 || Kitt Peak || Spacewatch || — || align=right | 1.1 km || 
|-id=831 bgcolor=#d6d6d6
| 295831 ||  || — || October 24, 2008 || Socorro || LINEAR || — || align=right | 3.5 km || 
|-id=832 bgcolor=#E9E9E9
| 295832 ||  || — || October 28, 2008 || Kitt Peak || Spacewatch || — || align=right | 1.2 km || 
|-id=833 bgcolor=#E9E9E9
| 295833 ||  || — || October 30, 2008 || Kitt Peak || Spacewatch || AER || align=right | 1.8 km || 
|-id=834 bgcolor=#d6d6d6
| 295834 ||  || — || November 1, 2008 || Kitami || K. Endate || — || align=right | 3.7 km || 
|-id=835 bgcolor=#E9E9E9
| 295835 ||  || — || November 2, 2008 || Socorro || LINEAR || — || align=right | 2.7 km || 
|-id=836 bgcolor=#fefefe
| 295836 ||  || — || November 2, 2008 || Socorro || LINEAR || FLO || align=right data-sort-value="0.67" | 670 m || 
|-id=837 bgcolor=#E9E9E9
| 295837 ||  || — || November 3, 2008 || Socorro || LINEAR || — || align=right | 3.3 km || 
|-id=838 bgcolor=#fefefe
| 295838 ||  || — || November 1, 2008 || Mount Lemmon || Mount Lemmon Survey || — || align=right data-sort-value="0.99" | 990 m || 
|-id=839 bgcolor=#d6d6d6
| 295839 ||  || — || November 2, 2008 || Vail-Jarnac || Jarnac Obs. || — || align=right | 3.1 km || 
|-id=840 bgcolor=#fefefe
| 295840 ||  || — || November 2, 2008 || Mount Lemmon || Mount Lemmon Survey || — || align=right data-sort-value="0.95" | 950 m || 
|-id=841 bgcolor=#E9E9E9
| 295841 Gorbulin ||  ||  || November 7, 2008 || Andrushivka || Andrushivka Obs. || — || align=right | 2.7 km || 
|-id=842 bgcolor=#fefefe
| 295842 ||  || — || November 7, 2008 || Andrushivka || Andrushivka Obs. || — || align=right data-sort-value="0.93" | 930 m || 
|-id=843 bgcolor=#d6d6d6
| 295843 ||  || — || November 2, 2008 || Mount Lemmon || Mount Lemmon Survey || CHA || align=right | 2.4 km || 
|-id=844 bgcolor=#E9E9E9
| 295844 ||  || — || November 2, 2008 || Catalina || CSS || MAR || align=right | 1.7 km || 
|-id=845 bgcolor=#fefefe
| 295845 ||  || — || January 7, 2006 || Mount Lemmon || Mount Lemmon Survey || — || align=right | 1.1 km || 
|-id=846 bgcolor=#E9E9E9
| 295846 ||  || — || November 2, 2008 || Kitt Peak || Spacewatch || — || align=right | 2.8 km || 
|-id=847 bgcolor=#fefefe
| 295847 ||  || — || November 3, 2008 || Mount Lemmon || Mount Lemmon Survey || — || align=right data-sort-value="0.90" | 900 m || 
|-id=848 bgcolor=#fefefe
| 295848 ||  || — || November 6, 2008 || Kitt Peak || Spacewatch || — || align=right | 1.0 km || 
|-id=849 bgcolor=#E9E9E9
| 295849 ||  || — || November 6, 2008 || Mount Lemmon || Mount Lemmon Survey || — || align=right | 3.2 km || 
|-id=850 bgcolor=#d6d6d6
| 295850 ||  || — || November 6, 2008 || Mount Lemmon || Mount Lemmon Survey || — || align=right | 3.6 km || 
|-id=851 bgcolor=#fefefe
| 295851 ||  || — || November 7, 2008 || Catalina || CSS || — || align=right data-sort-value="0.75" | 750 m || 
|-id=852 bgcolor=#fefefe
| 295852 ||  || — || November 8, 2008 || Kitt Peak || Spacewatch || NYS || align=right data-sort-value="0.78" | 780 m || 
|-id=853 bgcolor=#fefefe
| 295853 ||  || — || November 7, 2008 || Mount Lemmon || Mount Lemmon Survey || — || align=right data-sort-value="0.89" | 890 m || 
|-id=854 bgcolor=#E9E9E9
| 295854 ||  || — || November 6, 2008 || Mount Lemmon || Mount Lemmon Survey || — || align=right | 3.8 km || 
|-id=855 bgcolor=#fefefe
| 295855 ||  || — || November 9, 2008 || Kitt Peak || Spacewatch || MAS || align=right data-sort-value="0.85" | 850 m || 
|-id=856 bgcolor=#fefefe
| 295856 ||  || — || November 8, 2008 || Kitt Peak || Spacewatch || — || align=right data-sort-value="0.71" | 710 m || 
|-id=857 bgcolor=#E9E9E9
| 295857 ||  || — || November 8, 2008 || Kitt Peak || Spacewatch || — || align=right | 2.5 km || 
|-id=858 bgcolor=#E9E9E9
| 295858 ||  || — || November 3, 2008 || Mount Lemmon || Mount Lemmon Survey || AGN || align=right | 1.3 km || 
|-id=859 bgcolor=#fefefe
| 295859 ||  || — || November 7, 2008 || Mount Lemmon || Mount Lemmon Survey || V || align=right data-sort-value="0.79" | 790 m || 
|-id=860 bgcolor=#E9E9E9
| 295860 ||  || — || November 8, 2008 || Catalina || CSS || BRU || align=right | 4.6 km || 
|-id=861 bgcolor=#d6d6d6
| 295861 ||  || — || November 1, 2008 || Mount Lemmon || Mount Lemmon Survey || — || align=right | 6.3 km || 
|-id=862 bgcolor=#fefefe
| 295862 ||  || — || November 17, 2008 || Kitt Peak || Spacewatch || V || align=right data-sort-value="0.84" | 840 m || 
|-id=863 bgcolor=#fefefe
| 295863 ||  || — || November 17, 2008 || Kitt Peak || Spacewatch || — || align=right data-sort-value="0.67" | 670 m || 
|-id=864 bgcolor=#E9E9E9
| 295864 ||  || — || November 17, 2008 || Kitt Peak || Spacewatch || — || align=right | 1.7 km || 
|-id=865 bgcolor=#fefefe
| 295865 ||  || — || November 18, 2008 || Catalina || CSS || — || align=right data-sort-value="0.96" | 960 m || 
|-id=866 bgcolor=#E9E9E9
| 295866 ||  || — || November 18, 2008 || Catalina || CSS || — || align=right | 2.5 km || 
|-id=867 bgcolor=#fefefe
| 295867 ||  || — || November 19, 2008 || Dauban || F. Kugel || — || align=right data-sort-value="0.87" | 870 m || 
|-id=868 bgcolor=#d6d6d6
| 295868 ||  || — || November 17, 2008 || Kitt Peak || Spacewatch || KOR || align=right | 1.4 km || 
|-id=869 bgcolor=#E9E9E9
| 295869 ||  || — || November 18, 2008 || Kitt Peak || Spacewatch || — || align=right | 1.7 km || 
|-id=870 bgcolor=#fefefe
| 295870 ||  || — || November 18, 2008 || Catalina || CSS || — || align=right data-sort-value="0.84" | 840 m || 
|-id=871 bgcolor=#E9E9E9
| 295871 ||  || — || November 19, 2008 || Mount Lemmon || Mount Lemmon Survey || — || align=right | 1.3 km || 
|-id=872 bgcolor=#E9E9E9
| 295872 ||  || — || November 19, 2008 || Kitt Peak || Spacewatch || — || align=right | 2.0 km || 
|-id=873 bgcolor=#fefefe
| 295873 ||  || — || November 19, 2008 || Mount Lemmon || Mount Lemmon Survey || NYS || align=right data-sort-value="0.82" | 820 m || 
|-id=874 bgcolor=#E9E9E9
| 295874 ||  || — || November 20, 2008 || Goodricke-Pigott || R. A. Tucker || — || align=right | 2.2 km || 
|-id=875 bgcolor=#E9E9E9
| 295875 ||  || — || November 17, 2008 || Kitt Peak || Spacewatch || — || align=right | 3.0 km || 
|-id=876 bgcolor=#fefefe
| 295876 ||  || — || November 17, 2008 || Kitt Peak || Spacewatch || — || align=right data-sort-value="0.88" | 880 m || 
|-id=877 bgcolor=#E9E9E9
| 295877 ||  || — || November 17, 2008 || Kitt Peak || Spacewatch || — || align=right | 1.5 km || 
|-id=878 bgcolor=#E9E9E9
| 295878 ||  || — || November 17, 2008 || Kitt Peak || Spacewatch || — || align=right | 2.0 km || 
|-id=879 bgcolor=#fefefe
| 295879 ||  || — || November 17, 2008 || Kitt Peak || Spacewatch || MAS || align=right data-sort-value="0.82" | 820 m || 
|-id=880 bgcolor=#d6d6d6
| 295880 ||  || — || November 17, 2008 || Kitt Peak || Spacewatch || THM || align=right | 2.0 km || 
|-id=881 bgcolor=#fefefe
| 295881 ||  || — || November 18, 2008 || Catalina || CSS || — || align=right data-sort-value="0.71" | 710 m || 
|-id=882 bgcolor=#fefefe
| 295882 ||  || — || November 20, 2008 || Mount Lemmon || Mount Lemmon Survey || MAS || align=right data-sort-value="0.80" | 800 m || 
|-id=883 bgcolor=#E9E9E9
| 295883 ||  || — || November 18, 2008 || Socorro || LINEAR || — || align=right | 3.9 km || 
|-id=884 bgcolor=#fefefe
| 295884 ||  || — || November 23, 2008 || La Sagra || OAM Obs. || FLO || align=right data-sort-value="0.70" | 700 m || 
|-id=885 bgcolor=#E9E9E9
| 295885 ||  || — || November 17, 2008 || Kitt Peak || Spacewatch || — || align=right | 2.7 km || 
|-id=886 bgcolor=#d6d6d6
| 295886 ||  || — || November 18, 2008 || Kitt Peak || Spacewatch || 3:2 || align=right | 4.4 km || 
|-id=887 bgcolor=#E9E9E9
| 295887 ||  || — || November 18, 2008 || Kitt Peak || Spacewatch || — || align=right | 2.7 km || 
|-id=888 bgcolor=#fefefe
| 295888 ||  || — || November 18, 2008 || Kitt Peak || Spacewatch || MAS || align=right data-sort-value="0.83" | 830 m || 
|-id=889 bgcolor=#E9E9E9
| 295889 ||  || — || November 18, 2008 || Kitt Peak || Spacewatch || HOF || align=right | 4.6 km || 
|-id=890 bgcolor=#E9E9E9
| 295890 ||  || — || November 19, 2008 || Kitt Peak || Spacewatch || — || align=right | 2.8 km || 
|-id=891 bgcolor=#fefefe
| 295891 ||  || — || November 19, 2008 || Mount Lemmon || Mount Lemmon Survey || — || align=right | 1.0 km || 
|-id=892 bgcolor=#E9E9E9
| 295892 ||  || — || November 20, 2008 || Kitt Peak || Spacewatch || AST || align=right | 1.6 km || 
|-id=893 bgcolor=#d6d6d6
| 295893 ||  || — || November 20, 2008 || Mount Lemmon || Mount Lemmon Survey || — || align=right | 5.0 km || 
|-id=894 bgcolor=#d6d6d6
| 295894 ||  || — || November 20, 2008 || Kitt Peak || Spacewatch || — || align=right | 4.5 km || 
|-id=895 bgcolor=#fefefe
| 295895 ||  || — || November 20, 2008 || Kitt Peak || Spacewatch || — || align=right | 1.0 km || 
|-id=896 bgcolor=#fefefe
| 295896 ||  || — || November 20, 2008 || Kitt Peak || Spacewatch || NYS || align=right data-sort-value="0.74" | 740 m || 
|-id=897 bgcolor=#E9E9E9
| 295897 ||  || — || November 20, 2008 || Kitt Peak || Spacewatch || — || align=right | 2.5 km || 
|-id=898 bgcolor=#fefefe
| 295898 ||  || — || November 20, 2008 || Kitt Peak || Spacewatch || — || align=right data-sort-value="0.94" | 940 m || 
|-id=899 bgcolor=#E9E9E9
| 295899 ||  || — || November 20, 2008 || Kitt Peak || Spacewatch || — || align=right | 2.7 km || 
|-id=900 bgcolor=#E9E9E9
| 295900 ||  || — || November 20, 2008 || Kitt Peak || Spacewatch || — || align=right | 1.6 km || 
|}

295901–296000 

|-bgcolor=#E9E9E9
| 295901 ||  || — || November 21, 2008 || Kitt Peak || Spacewatch || — || align=right | 2.1 km || 
|-id=902 bgcolor=#fefefe
| 295902 ||  || — || November 21, 2008 || Kitt Peak || Spacewatch || V || align=right data-sort-value="0.85" | 850 m || 
|-id=903 bgcolor=#d6d6d6
| 295903 ||  || — || November 22, 2008 || Mount Lemmon || Mount Lemmon Survey || HYG || align=right | 3.5 km || 
|-id=904 bgcolor=#C2FFFF
| 295904 ||  || — || November 25, 2008 || Dauban || F. Kugel || L4 || align=right | 14 km || 
|-id=905 bgcolor=#E9E9E9
| 295905 ||  || — || November 26, 2008 || La Sagra || OAM Obs. || — || align=right | 3.9 km || 
|-id=906 bgcolor=#d6d6d6
| 295906 ||  || — || November 24, 2008 || Sierra Stars || W. G. Dillon, D. Wells || THM || align=right | 2.5 km || 
|-id=907 bgcolor=#fefefe
| 295907 ||  || — || November 27, 2008 || Pla D'Arguines || R. Ferrando || — || align=right data-sort-value="0.96" | 960 m || 
|-id=908 bgcolor=#fefefe
| 295908 ||  || — || November 30, 2008 || Plana || F. Fratev || — || align=right data-sort-value="0.79" | 790 m || 
|-id=909 bgcolor=#E9E9E9
| 295909 ||  || — || November 24, 2008 || Mount Lemmon || Mount Lemmon Survey || — || align=right | 1.4 km || 
|-id=910 bgcolor=#fefefe
| 295910 ||  || — || November 24, 2008 || Mount Lemmon || Mount Lemmon Survey || — || align=right data-sort-value="0.77" | 770 m || 
|-id=911 bgcolor=#d6d6d6
| 295911 ||  || — || November 19, 2008 || Catalina || CSS || Tj (2.96) || align=right | 7.1 km || 
|-id=912 bgcolor=#fefefe
| 295912 ||  || — || November 30, 2008 || Kitt Peak || Spacewatch || V || align=right data-sort-value="0.88" | 880 m || 
|-id=913 bgcolor=#E9E9E9
| 295913 ||  || — || September 16, 2003 || Kitt Peak || Spacewatch || — || align=right | 2.4 km || 
|-id=914 bgcolor=#E9E9E9
| 295914 ||  || — || November 30, 2008 || Kitt Peak || Spacewatch || — || align=right | 1.2 km || 
|-id=915 bgcolor=#E9E9E9
| 295915 ||  || — || November 30, 2008 || Kitt Peak || Spacewatch || — || align=right | 1.2 km || 
|-id=916 bgcolor=#fefefe
| 295916 ||  || — || November 18, 2008 || Kitt Peak || Spacewatch || MAS || align=right data-sort-value="0.94" | 940 m || 
|-id=917 bgcolor=#E9E9E9
| 295917 ||  || — || November 30, 2008 || Mount Lemmon || Mount Lemmon Survey || — || align=right | 1.3 km || 
|-id=918 bgcolor=#d6d6d6
| 295918 ||  || — || November 19, 2008 || Kitt Peak || Spacewatch || HYG || align=right | 2.8 km || 
|-id=919 bgcolor=#fefefe
| 295919 ||  || — || November 22, 2008 || Kitt Peak || Spacewatch || — || align=right | 1.2 km || 
|-id=920 bgcolor=#d6d6d6
| 295920 ||  || — || November 18, 2008 || Catalina || CSS || — || align=right | 4.7 km || 
|-id=921 bgcolor=#E9E9E9
| 295921 ||  || — || November 21, 2008 || Mount Lemmon || Mount Lemmon Survey || — || align=right | 2.4 km || 
|-id=922 bgcolor=#fefefe
| 295922 ||  || — || November 18, 2008 || Kitt Peak || Spacewatch || — || align=right | 1.1 km || 
|-id=923 bgcolor=#E9E9E9
| 295923 ||  || — || November 18, 2008 || Kitt Peak || Spacewatch || — || align=right | 1.5 km || 
|-id=924 bgcolor=#d6d6d6
| 295924 ||  || — || November 20, 2008 || Kitt Peak || Spacewatch || — || align=right | 2.9 km || 
|-id=925 bgcolor=#fefefe
| 295925 ||  || — || November 23, 2008 || Kitt Peak || Spacewatch || — || align=right | 1.2 km || 
|-id=926 bgcolor=#E9E9E9
| 295926 ||  || — || November 24, 2008 || Socorro || LINEAR || — || align=right | 3.1 km || 
|-id=927 bgcolor=#d6d6d6
| 295927 ||  || — || November 30, 2008 || Socorro || LINEAR || — || align=right | 4.0 km || 
|-id=928 bgcolor=#E9E9E9
| 295928 ||  || — || September 22, 2003 || Palomar || NEAT || MAR || align=right | 1.9 km || 
|-id=929 bgcolor=#E9E9E9
| 295929 ||  || — || December 1, 2008 || Bisei SG Center || BATTeRS || — || align=right | 2.9 km || 
|-id=930 bgcolor=#d6d6d6
| 295930 ||  || — || December 3, 2008 || Socorro || LINEAR || — || align=right | 4.4 km || 
|-id=931 bgcolor=#d6d6d6
| 295931 ||  || — || December 7, 2008 || Dauban || F. Kugel || — || align=right | 4.4 km || 
|-id=932 bgcolor=#fefefe
| 295932 ||  || — || December 4, 2008 || Socorro || LINEAR || — || align=right | 1.1 km || 
|-id=933 bgcolor=#d6d6d6
| 295933 ||  || — || December 4, 2008 || Socorro || LINEAR || EOS || align=right | 2.8 km || 
|-id=934 bgcolor=#E9E9E9
| 295934 ||  || — || December 7, 2008 || Marly || P. Kocher || HNS || align=right | 1.7 km || 
|-id=935 bgcolor=#fefefe
| 295935 ||  || — || December 15, 2008 || Weihai || Shandong University Obs. || — || align=right data-sort-value="0.98" | 980 m || 
|-id=936 bgcolor=#E9E9E9
| 295936 ||  || — || December 1, 2008 || Catalina || CSS || — || align=right | 1.6 km || 
|-id=937 bgcolor=#d6d6d6
| 295937 ||  || — || December 3, 2008 || Mount Lemmon || Mount Lemmon Survey || HYG || align=right | 3.1 km || 
|-id=938 bgcolor=#fefefe
| 295938 ||  || — || December 1, 2008 || Kitt Peak || Spacewatch || — || align=right | 1.9 km || 
|-id=939 bgcolor=#fefefe
| 295939 ||  || — || December 1, 2008 || Kitt Peak || Spacewatch || NYS || align=right data-sort-value="0.72" | 720 m || 
|-id=940 bgcolor=#E9E9E9
| 295940 ||  || — || October 17, 2003 || Apache Point || SDSS || — || align=right | 1.4 km || 
|-id=941 bgcolor=#E9E9E9
| 295941 ||  || — || December 1, 2008 || Kitt Peak || Spacewatch || — || align=right | 2.7 km || 
|-id=942 bgcolor=#d6d6d6
| 295942 ||  || — || December 4, 2008 || Mount Lemmon || Mount Lemmon Survey || EOS || align=right | 2.6 km || 
|-id=943 bgcolor=#d6d6d6
| 295943 ||  || — || December 1, 2008 || Kitt Peak || Spacewatch || — || align=right | 5.3 km || 
|-id=944 bgcolor=#E9E9E9
| 295944 ||  || — || December 2, 2008 || Kitt Peak || Spacewatch || — || align=right | 1.2 km || 
|-id=945 bgcolor=#d6d6d6
| 295945 ||  || — || December 3, 2008 || Kitt Peak || Spacewatch || — || align=right | 3.8 km || 
|-id=946 bgcolor=#d6d6d6
| 295946 ||  || — || December 3, 2008 || Kitt Peak || Spacewatch || — || align=right | 5.5 km || 
|-id=947 bgcolor=#fefefe
| 295947 ||  || — || December 4, 2008 || Mount Lemmon || Mount Lemmon Survey || — || align=right data-sort-value="0.87" | 870 m || 
|-id=948 bgcolor=#E9E9E9
| 295948 ||  || — || December 4, 2008 || Catalina || CSS || — || align=right | 3.2 km || 
|-id=949 bgcolor=#fefefe
| 295949 ||  || — || December 5, 2008 || Mount Lemmon || Mount Lemmon Survey || V || align=right data-sort-value="0.92" | 920 m || 
|-id=950 bgcolor=#E9E9E9
| 295950 ||  || — || December 3, 2008 || Mount Lemmon || Mount Lemmon Survey || — || align=right | 1.4 km || 
|-id=951 bgcolor=#d6d6d6
| 295951 ||  || — || December 6, 2008 || Socorro || LINEAR || — || align=right | 4.5 km || 
|-id=952 bgcolor=#fefefe
| 295952 ||  || — || December 1, 2008 || Socorro || LINEAR || MAS || align=right data-sort-value="0.99" | 990 m || 
|-id=953 bgcolor=#E9E9E9
| 295953 ||  || — || December 1, 2008 || Mount Lemmon || Mount Lemmon Survey || — || align=right | 2.4 km || 
|-id=954 bgcolor=#d6d6d6
| 295954 ||  || — || December 3, 2008 || Mount Lemmon || Mount Lemmon Survey || EOS || align=right | 2.5 km || 
|-id=955 bgcolor=#fefefe
| 295955 ||  || — || December 7, 2008 || Mount Lemmon || Mount Lemmon Survey || NYS || align=right data-sort-value="0.84" | 840 m || 
|-id=956 bgcolor=#fefefe
| 295956 ||  || — || December 22, 2008 || Mayhill || A. Lowe || — || align=right data-sort-value="0.98" | 980 m || 
|-id=957 bgcolor=#d6d6d6
| 295957 ||  || — || December 22, 2008 || Calar Alto || F. Hormuth || — || align=right | 3.6 km || 
|-id=958 bgcolor=#fefefe
| 295958 ||  || — || December 22, 2008 || Dauban || F. Kugel || V || align=right data-sort-value="0.84" | 840 m || 
|-id=959 bgcolor=#d6d6d6
| 295959 ||  || — || December 20, 2008 || Catalina || CSS || TIR || align=right | 4.3 km || 
|-id=960 bgcolor=#E9E9E9
| 295960 ||  || — || December 21, 2008 || Mount Lemmon || Mount Lemmon Survey || HEN || align=right | 1.3 km || 
|-id=961 bgcolor=#E9E9E9
| 295961 ||  || — || December 21, 2008 || Mount Lemmon || Mount Lemmon Survey || MIT || align=right | 2.0 km || 
|-id=962 bgcolor=#E9E9E9
| 295962 ||  || — || December 21, 2008 || Mount Lemmon || Mount Lemmon Survey || — || align=right | 1.2 km || 
|-id=963 bgcolor=#fefefe
| 295963 ||  || — || December 21, 2008 || Mount Lemmon || Mount Lemmon Survey || NYS || align=right data-sort-value="0.76" | 760 m || 
|-id=964 bgcolor=#d6d6d6
| 295964 ||  || — || December 21, 2008 || Mount Lemmon || Mount Lemmon Survey || HYG || align=right | 3.1 km || 
|-id=965 bgcolor=#fefefe
| 295965 ||  || — || December 21, 2008 || Mount Lemmon || Mount Lemmon Survey || ERI || align=right | 2.1 km || 
|-id=966 bgcolor=#d6d6d6
| 295966 ||  || — || December 21, 2008 || La Sagra || OAM Obs. || — || align=right | 5.7 km || 
|-id=967 bgcolor=#fefefe
| 295967 ||  || — || December 21, 2008 || Kitt Peak || Spacewatch || FLO || align=right data-sort-value="0.86" | 860 m || 
|-id=968 bgcolor=#fefefe
| 295968 ||  || — || December 24, 2008 || La Sagra || OAM Obs. || — || align=right | 1.7 km || 
|-id=969 bgcolor=#fefefe
| 295969 ||  || — || December 28, 2008 || Mayhill || A. Lowe || NYS || align=right data-sort-value="0.88" | 880 m || 
|-id=970 bgcolor=#fefefe
| 295970 ||  || — || December 28, 2008 || Piszkéstető || K. Sárneczky || — || align=right data-sort-value="0.75" | 750 m || 
|-id=971 bgcolor=#fefefe
| 295971 ||  || — || December 29, 2008 || Piszkéstető || K. Sárneczky || — || align=right | 1.1 km || 
|-id=972 bgcolor=#E9E9E9
| 295972 ||  || — || December 29, 2008 || Piszkéstető || K. Sárneczky || — || align=right | 1.9 km || 
|-id=973 bgcolor=#fefefe
| 295973 ||  || — || December 24, 2008 || Dauban || F. Kugel || V || align=right data-sort-value="0.86" | 860 m || 
|-id=974 bgcolor=#fefefe
| 295974 ||  || — || December 22, 2008 || Kitt Peak || Spacewatch || PHO || align=right | 1.2 km || 
|-id=975 bgcolor=#d6d6d6
| 295975 ||  || — || December 22, 2008 || Kitt Peak || Spacewatch || — || align=right | 3.7 km || 
|-id=976 bgcolor=#E9E9E9
| 295976 ||  || — || December 29, 2008 || Mount Lemmon || Mount Lemmon Survey || — || align=right | 1.3 km || 
|-id=977 bgcolor=#fefefe
| 295977 ||  || — || December 29, 2008 || Kitt Peak || Spacewatch || — || align=right | 1.3 km || 
|-id=978 bgcolor=#E9E9E9
| 295978 ||  || — || December 29, 2008 || Mount Lemmon || Mount Lemmon Survey || — || align=right | 2.8 km || 
|-id=979 bgcolor=#E9E9E9
| 295979 ||  || — || December 29, 2008 || Kitt Peak || Spacewatch || HOF || align=right | 3.0 km || 
|-id=980 bgcolor=#E9E9E9
| 295980 ||  || — || December 29, 2008 || Kitt Peak || Spacewatch || HOF || align=right | 3.2 km || 
|-id=981 bgcolor=#E9E9E9
| 295981 ||  || — || December 29, 2008 || Mount Lemmon || Mount Lemmon Survey || — || align=right | 2.3 km || 
|-id=982 bgcolor=#E9E9E9
| 295982 ||  || — || December 29, 2008 || Mount Lemmon || Mount Lemmon Survey || — || align=right | 3.0 km || 
|-id=983 bgcolor=#E9E9E9
| 295983 ||  || — || December 30, 2008 || Kitt Peak || Spacewatch || — || align=right | 2.8 km || 
|-id=984 bgcolor=#E9E9E9
| 295984 ||  || — || December 30, 2008 || Kitt Peak || Spacewatch || — || align=right | 2.0 km || 
|-id=985 bgcolor=#fefefe
| 295985 ||  || — || November 21, 2000 || Socorro || LINEAR || NYS || align=right | 1.1 km || 
|-id=986 bgcolor=#d6d6d6
| 295986 ||  || — || December 30, 2008 || Mount Lemmon || Mount Lemmon Survey || — || align=right | 3.8 km || 
|-id=987 bgcolor=#E9E9E9
| 295987 ||  || — || December 29, 2008 || Taunus || E. Schwab, R. Kling || XIZ || align=right | 1.6 km || 
|-id=988 bgcolor=#d6d6d6
| 295988 ||  || — || December 30, 2008 || Mount Lemmon || Mount Lemmon Survey || — || align=right | 2.7 km || 
|-id=989 bgcolor=#E9E9E9
| 295989 ||  || — || December 30, 2008 || Mount Lemmon || Mount Lemmon Survey || — || align=right | 1.9 km || 
|-id=990 bgcolor=#E9E9E9
| 295990 ||  || — || December 30, 2008 || Kitt Peak || Spacewatch || XIZ || align=right | 1.5 km || 
|-id=991 bgcolor=#E9E9E9
| 295991 ||  || — || December 30, 2008 || Mount Lemmon || Mount Lemmon Survey || — || align=right | 2.8 km || 
|-id=992 bgcolor=#d6d6d6
| 295992 ||  || — || December 29, 2008 || Kitt Peak || Spacewatch || — || align=right | 3.8 km || 
|-id=993 bgcolor=#fefefe
| 295993 ||  || — || December 29, 2008 || Kitt Peak || Spacewatch || — || align=right data-sort-value="0.73" | 730 m || 
|-id=994 bgcolor=#E9E9E9
| 295994 ||  || — || December 29, 2008 || Kitt Peak || Spacewatch || — || align=right | 1.7 km || 
|-id=995 bgcolor=#fefefe
| 295995 ||  || — || December 29, 2008 || Kitt Peak || Spacewatch || — || align=right | 1.0 km || 
|-id=996 bgcolor=#E9E9E9
| 295996 ||  || — || December 29, 2008 || Kitt Peak || Spacewatch || — || align=right | 2.0 km || 
|-id=997 bgcolor=#d6d6d6
| 295997 ||  || — || December 29, 2008 || Kitt Peak || Spacewatch || EOS || align=right | 2.6 km || 
|-id=998 bgcolor=#E9E9E9
| 295998 ||  || — || December 29, 2008 || Kitt Peak || Spacewatch || — || align=right | 2.2 km || 
|-id=999 bgcolor=#E9E9E9
| 295999 ||  || — || December 29, 2008 || Kitt Peak || Spacewatch || WIT || align=right | 1.4 km || 
|-id=000 bgcolor=#fefefe
| 296000 ||  || — || December 29, 2008 || Mount Lemmon || Mount Lemmon Survey || NYS || align=right data-sort-value="0.65" | 650 m || 
|}

References

External links 
 Discovery Circumstances: Numbered Minor Planets (295001)–(300000) (IAU Minor Planet Center)

0295